

143001–143100 

|-bgcolor=#E9E9E9
| 143001 ||  || — || November 11, 2002 || Socorro || LINEAR || — || align=right | 2.4 km || 
|-id=002 bgcolor=#E9E9E9
| 143002 ||  || — || November 11, 2002 || Socorro || LINEAR || — || align=right | 1.9 km || 
|-id=003 bgcolor=#fefefe
| 143003 ||  || — || November 11, 2002 || Socorro || LINEAR || — || align=right | 4.5 km || 
|-id=004 bgcolor=#E9E9E9
| 143004 ||  || — || November 12, 2002 || Socorro || LINEAR || — || align=right | 3.2 km || 
|-id=005 bgcolor=#E9E9E9
| 143005 ||  || — || November 12, 2002 || Socorro || LINEAR || — || align=right | 2.6 km || 
|-id=006 bgcolor=#E9E9E9
| 143006 ||  || — || November 12, 2002 || Socorro || LINEAR || — || align=right | 2.0 km || 
|-id=007 bgcolor=#E9E9E9
| 143007 ||  || — || November 12, 2002 || Socorro || LINEAR || EUN || align=right | 2.1 km || 
|-id=008 bgcolor=#E9E9E9
| 143008 ||  || — || November 12, 2002 || Socorro || LINEAR || PAD || align=right | 4.5 km || 
|-id=009 bgcolor=#E9E9E9
| 143009 ||  || — || November 12, 2002 || Socorro || LINEAR || WIT || align=right | 2.1 km || 
|-id=010 bgcolor=#E9E9E9
| 143010 ||  || — || November 12, 2002 || Socorro || LINEAR || — || align=right | 4.3 km || 
|-id=011 bgcolor=#E9E9E9
| 143011 ||  || — || November 12, 2002 || Socorro || LINEAR || — || align=right | 2.6 km || 
|-id=012 bgcolor=#E9E9E9
| 143012 ||  || — || November 12, 2002 || Socorro || LINEAR || — || align=right | 2.1 km || 
|-id=013 bgcolor=#E9E9E9
| 143013 ||  || — || November 12, 2002 || Socorro || LINEAR || — || align=right | 3.9 km || 
|-id=014 bgcolor=#E9E9E9
| 143014 ||  || — || November 12, 2002 || Socorro || LINEAR || MRX || align=right | 1.7 km || 
|-id=015 bgcolor=#E9E9E9
| 143015 ||  || — || November 12, 2002 || Socorro || LINEAR || — || align=right | 2.1 km || 
|-id=016 bgcolor=#E9E9E9
| 143016 ||  || — || November 12, 2002 || Socorro || LINEAR || — || align=right | 3.4 km || 
|-id=017 bgcolor=#E9E9E9
| 143017 ||  || — || November 12, 2002 || Socorro || LINEAR || — || align=right | 2.9 km || 
|-id=018 bgcolor=#E9E9E9
| 143018 ||  || — || November 12, 2002 || Socorro || LINEAR || RAF || align=right | 2.1 km || 
|-id=019 bgcolor=#E9E9E9
| 143019 ||  || — || November 12, 2002 || Socorro || LINEAR || EUN || align=right | 2.6 km || 
|-id=020 bgcolor=#E9E9E9
| 143020 ||  || — || November 12, 2002 || Socorro || LINEAR || — || align=right | 3.2 km || 
|-id=021 bgcolor=#E9E9E9
| 143021 ||  || — || November 12, 2002 || Socorro || LINEAR || — || align=right | 3.9 km || 
|-id=022 bgcolor=#E9E9E9
| 143022 ||  || — || November 12, 2002 || Socorro || LINEAR || — || align=right | 2.8 km || 
|-id=023 bgcolor=#E9E9E9
| 143023 ||  || — || November 13, 2002 || Palomar || NEAT || — || align=right | 1.8 km || 
|-id=024 bgcolor=#E9E9E9
| 143024 ||  || — || November 13, 2002 || Palomar || NEAT || HNS || align=right | 2.8 km || 
|-id=025 bgcolor=#fefefe
| 143025 ||  || — || November 13, 2002 || Palomar || NEAT || NYS || align=right data-sort-value="0.93" | 930 m || 
|-id=026 bgcolor=#E9E9E9
| 143026 ||  || — || November 13, 2002 || Palomar || NEAT || — || align=right | 2.4 km || 
|-id=027 bgcolor=#E9E9E9
| 143027 ||  || — || November 13, 2002 || Palomar || NEAT || — || align=right | 4.9 km || 
|-id=028 bgcolor=#E9E9E9
| 143028 ||  || — || November 11, 2002 || Anderson Mesa || LONEOS || — || align=right | 3.5 km || 
|-id=029 bgcolor=#fefefe
| 143029 ||  || — || November 12, 2002 || Socorro || LINEAR || NYS || align=right | 3.1 km || 
|-id=030 bgcolor=#E9E9E9
| 143030 ||  || — || November 12, 2002 || Socorro || LINEAR || — || align=right | 2.0 km || 
|-id=031 bgcolor=#E9E9E9
| 143031 ||  || — || November 12, 2002 || Socorro || LINEAR || — || align=right | 2.0 km || 
|-id=032 bgcolor=#E9E9E9
| 143032 ||  || — || November 12, 2002 || Socorro || LINEAR || — || align=right | 1.9 km || 
|-id=033 bgcolor=#E9E9E9
| 143033 ||  || — || November 13, 2002 || Socorro || LINEAR || — || align=right | 4.0 km || 
|-id=034 bgcolor=#E9E9E9
| 143034 ||  || — || November 13, 2002 || Socorro || LINEAR || — || align=right | 2.8 km || 
|-id=035 bgcolor=#E9E9E9
| 143035 ||  || — || November 13, 2002 || Palomar || NEAT || slow || align=right | 2.6 km || 
|-id=036 bgcolor=#E9E9E9
| 143036 ||  || — || November 13, 2002 || Palomar || NEAT || — || align=right | 2.5 km || 
|-id=037 bgcolor=#E9E9E9
| 143037 ||  || — || November 13, 2002 || Palomar || NEAT || — || align=right | 2.0 km || 
|-id=038 bgcolor=#E9E9E9
| 143038 ||  || — || November 13, 2002 || Palomar || NEAT || — || align=right | 2.5 km || 
|-id=039 bgcolor=#E9E9E9
| 143039 ||  || — || November 13, 2002 || Palomar || NEAT || EUN || align=right | 3.1 km || 
|-id=040 bgcolor=#E9E9E9
| 143040 ||  || — || November 14, 2002 || Socorro || LINEAR || — || align=right | 2.1 km || 
|-id=041 bgcolor=#E9E9E9
| 143041 ||  || — || November 13, 2002 || Palomar || NEAT || — || align=right | 2.9 km || 
|-id=042 bgcolor=#d6d6d6
| 143042 ||  || — || November 14, 2002 || Palomar || NEAT || — || align=right | 6.2 km || 
|-id=043 bgcolor=#fefefe
| 143043 ||  || — || November 14, 2002 || Socorro || LINEAR || NYS || align=right data-sort-value="0.97" | 970 m || 
|-id=044 bgcolor=#E9E9E9
| 143044 ||  || — || November 14, 2002 || Socorro || LINEAR || — || align=right | 1.8 km || 
|-id=045 bgcolor=#d6d6d6
| 143045 ||  || — || November 6, 2002 || Socorro || LINEAR || — || align=right | 4.6 km || 
|-id=046 bgcolor=#E9E9E9
| 143046 ||  || — || November 5, 2002 || Nyukasa || Mount Nyukasa Stn. || — || align=right | 2.1 km || 
|-id=047 bgcolor=#d6d6d6
| 143047 ||  || — || November 5, 2002 || Nyukasa || Mount Nyukasa Stn. || K-2 || align=right | 2.1 km || 
|-id=048 bgcolor=#E9E9E9
| 143048 Margaretpenston ||  ||  || November 2, 2002 || La Palma || A. Fitzsimmons, I. P. Williams || — || align=right | 1.9 km || 
|-id=049 bgcolor=#E9E9E9
| 143049 ||  || — || November 7, 2002 || Anderson Mesa || LONEOS || — || align=right | 1.8 km || 
|-id=050 bgcolor=#E9E9E9
| 143050 ||  || — || November 7, 2002 || Socorro || LINEAR || EUN || align=right | 2.2 km || 
|-id=051 bgcolor=#E9E9E9
| 143051 ||  || — || November 23, 2002 || Palomar || NEAT || — || align=right | 3.6 km || 
|-id=052 bgcolor=#fefefe
| 143052 ||  || — || November 24, 2002 || Wrightwood || J. W. Young || — || align=right | 1.6 km || 
|-id=053 bgcolor=#d6d6d6
| 143053 ||  || — || November 24, 2002 || Palomar || NEAT || — || align=right | 3.4 km || 
|-id=054 bgcolor=#d6d6d6
| 143054 ||  || — || November 24, 2002 || Palomar || NEAT || KOR || align=right | 2.3 km || 
|-id=055 bgcolor=#E9E9E9
| 143055 ||  || — || November 23, 2002 || Palomar || NEAT || — || align=right | 4.0 km || 
|-id=056 bgcolor=#E9E9E9
| 143056 ||  || — || November 24, 2002 || Palomar || NEAT || — || align=right | 2.4 km || 
|-id=057 bgcolor=#E9E9E9
| 143057 ||  || — || November 24, 2002 || Palomar || NEAT || MRX || align=right | 2.0 km || 
|-id=058 bgcolor=#E9E9E9
| 143058 ||  || — || November 24, 2002 || Palomar || NEAT || — || align=right | 2.7 km || 
|-id=059 bgcolor=#E9E9E9
| 143059 ||  || — || November 24, 2002 || Palomar || NEAT || — || align=right | 1.9 km || 
|-id=060 bgcolor=#E9E9E9
| 143060 ||  || — || November 27, 2002 || Anderson Mesa || LONEOS || — || align=right | 2.2 km || 
|-id=061 bgcolor=#E9E9E9
| 143061 ||  || — || November 23, 2002 || Palomar || NEAT || HEN || align=right | 2.0 km || 
|-id=062 bgcolor=#E9E9E9
| 143062 ||  || — || November 26, 2002 || Kitt Peak || Spacewatch || — || align=right | 4.7 km || 
|-id=063 bgcolor=#E9E9E9
| 143063 ||  || — || November 27, 2002 || Anderson Mesa || LONEOS || — || align=right | 3.0 km || 
|-id=064 bgcolor=#E9E9E9
| 143064 ||  || — || November 27, 2002 || Anderson Mesa || LONEOS || — || align=right | 3.6 km || 
|-id=065 bgcolor=#E9E9E9
| 143065 ||  || — || November 27, 2002 || Anderson Mesa || LONEOS || — || align=right | 2.4 km || 
|-id=066 bgcolor=#E9E9E9
| 143066 ||  || — || November 28, 2002 || Anderson Mesa || LONEOS || — || align=right | 2.8 km || 
|-id=067 bgcolor=#E9E9E9
| 143067 ||  || — || November 28, 2002 || Anderson Mesa || LONEOS || — || align=right | 3.4 km || 
|-id=068 bgcolor=#E9E9E9
| 143068 ||  || — || November 28, 2002 || Anderson Mesa || LONEOS || BRU || align=right | 6.1 km || 
|-id=069 bgcolor=#E9E9E9
| 143069 ||  || — || November 28, 2002 || Anderson Mesa || LONEOS || EUN || align=right | 2.2 km || 
|-id=070 bgcolor=#E9E9E9
| 143070 ||  || — || November 28, 2002 || Anderson Mesa || LONEOS || NEM || align=right | 3.6 km || 
|-id=071 bgcolor=#E9E9E9
| 143071 ||  || — || November 28, 2002 || Haleakala || NEAT || — || align=right | 3.2 km || 
|-id=072 bgcolor=#E9E9E9
| 143072 ||  || — || November 28, 2002 || Haleakala || NEAT || — || align=right | 1.8 km || 
|-id=073 bgcolor=#E9E9E9
| 143073 ||  || — || November 28, 2002 || Haleakala || NEAT || — || align=right | 1.9 km || 
|-id=074 bgcolor=#E9E9E9
| 143074 ||  || — || November 25, 2002 || Palomar || S. F. Hönig || — || align=right | 1.7 km || 
|-id=075 bgcolor=#E9E9E9
| 143075 ||  || — || November 29, 2002 || Farpoint || Farpoint Obs. || — || align=right | 4.4 km || 
|-id=076 bgcolor=#E9E9E9
| 143076 ||  || — || November 24, 2002 || Palomar || NEAT || — || align=right | 1.9 km || 
|-id=077 bgcolor=#E9E9E9
| 143077 ||  || — || December 1, 2002 || Socorro || LINEAR || — || align=right | 4.0 km || 
|-id=078 bgcolor=#E9E9E9
| 143078 ||  || — || December 1, 2002 || Socorro || LINEAR || — || align=right | 3.4 km || 
|-id=079 bgcolor=#E9E9E9
| 143079 ||  || — || December 1, 2002 || Socorro || LINEAR || — || align=right | 3.1 km || 
|-id=080 bgcolor=#E9E9E9
| 143080 ||  || — || December 2, 2002 || Socorro || LINEAR || — || align=right | 1.5 km || 
|-id=081 bgcolor=#FA8072
| 143081 ||  || — || December 1, 2002 || Socorro || LINEAR || — || align=right | 1.8 km || 
|-id=082 bgcolor=#E9E9E9
| 143082 ||  || — || December 1, 2002 || Socorro || LINEAR || — || align=right | 1.8 km || 
|-id=083 bgcolor=#E9E9E9
| 143083 ||  || — || December 1, 2002 || Haleakala || NEAT || — || align=right | 3.2 km || 
|-id=084 bgcolor=#E9E9E9
| 143084 ||  || — || December 1, 2002 || Haleakala || NEAT || — || align=right | 2.9 km || 
|-id=085 bgcolor=#E9E9E9
| 143085 ||  || — || December 2, 2002 || Socorro || LINEAR || — || align=right | 2.2 km || 
|-id=086 bgcolor=#E9E9E9
| 143086 ||  || — || December 2, 2002 || Socorro || LINEAR || — || align=right | 3.7 km || 
|-id=087 bgcolor=#E9E9E9
| 143087 ||  || — || December 2, 2002 || Socorro || LINEAR || RAF || align=right | 2.3 km || 
|-id=088 bgcolor=#E9E9E9
| 143088 ||  || — || December 2, 2002 || Socorro || LINEAR || — || align=right | 2.5 km || 
|-id=089 bgcolor=#E9E9E9
| 143089 ||  || — || December 2, 2002 || Socorro || LINEAR || — || align=right | 2.5 km || 
|-id=090 bgcolor=#E9E9E9
| 143090 ||  || — || December 2, 2002 || Socorro || LINEAR || — || align=right | 4.5 km || 
|-id=091 bgcolor=#fefefe
| 143091 ||  || — || December 3, 2002 || Haleakala || NEAT || V || align=right | 1.1 km || 
|-id=092 bgcolor=#E9E9E9
| 143092 ||  || — || December 3, 2002 || Haleakala || NEAT || XIZ || align=right | 2.4 km || 
|-id=093 bgcolor=#E9E9E9
| 143093 ||  || — || December 5, 2002 || Socorro || LINEAR || — || align=right | 2.9 km || 
|-id=094 bgcolor=#E9E9E9
| 143094 ||  || — || December 7, 2002 || Desert Eagle || W. K. Y. Yeung || — || align=right | 1.8 km || 
|-id=095 bgcolor=#E9E9E9
| 143095 ||  || — || December 7, 2002 || Desert Eagle || W. K. Y. Yeung || — || align=right | 3.5 km || 
|-id=096 bgcolor=#E9E9E9
| 143096 ||  || — || December 2, 2002 || Socorro || LINEAR || — || align=right | 3.6 km || 
|-id=097 bgcolor=#E9E9E9
| 143097 ||  || — || December 5, 2002 || Socorro || LINEAR || — || align=right | 2.4 km || 
|-id=098 bgcolor=#E9E9E9
| 143098 ||  || — || December 5, 2002 || Socorro || LINEAR || AGN || align=right | 2.5 km || 
|-id=099 bgcolor=#E9E9E9
| 143099 ||  || — || December 5, 2002 || Socorro || LINEAR || — || align=right | 5.6 km || 
|-id=100 bgcolor=#E9E9E9
| 143100 ||  || — || December 2, 2002 || Socorro || LINEAR || — || align=right | 3.3 km || 
|}

143101–143200 

|-bgcolor=#E9E9E9
| 143101 ||  || — || December 2, 2002 || Socorro || LINEAR || — || align=right | 5.2 km || 
|-id=102 bgcolor=#E9E9E9
| 143102 ||  || — || December 2, 2002 || Socorro || LINEAR || — || align=right | 2.9 km || 
|-id=103 bgcolor=#E9E9E9
| 143103 ||  || — || December 2, 2002 || Socorro || LINEAR || — || align=right | 2.1 km || 
|-id=104 bgcolor=#E9E9E9
| 143104 ||  || — || December 2, 2002 || Socorro || LINEAR || — || align=right | 2.0 km || 
|-id=105 bgcolor=#E9E9E9
| 143105 ||  || — || December 2, 2002 || Socorro || LINEAR || — || align=right | 5.9 km || 
|-id=106 bgcolor=#E9E9E9
| 143106 ||  || — || December 3, 2002 || Palomar || NEAT || PAD || align=right | 4.4 km || 
|-id=107 bgcolor=#E9E9E9
| 143107 ||  || — || December 5, 2002 || Palomar || NEAT || — || align=right | 4.3 km || 
|-id=108 bgcolor=#E9E9E9
| 143108 ||  || — || December 5, 2002 || Socorro || LINEAR || — || align=right | 3.9 km || 
|-id=109 bgcolor=#E9E9E9
| 143109 ||  || — || December 5, 2002 || Socorro || LINEAR || — || align=right | 1.7 km || 
|-id=110 bgcolor=#E9E9E9
| 143110 ||  || — || December 5, 2002 || Socorro || LINEAR || — || align=right | 4.5 km || 
|-id=111 bgcolor=#E9E9E9
| 143111 ||  || — || December 5, 2002 || Socorro || LINEAR || — || align=right | 1.6 km || 
|-id=112 bgcolor=#E9E9E9
| 143112 ||  || — || December 5, 2002 || Socorro || LINEAR || EUN || align=right | 2.1 km || 
|-id=113 bgcolor=#d6d6d6
| 143113 ||  || — || December 5, 2002 || Socorro || LINEAR || — || align=right | 5.1 km || 
|-id=114 bgcolor=#E9E9E9
| 143114 ||  || — || December 3, 2002 || Palomar || NEAT || — || align=right | 4.6 km || 
|-id=115 bgcolor=#E9E9E9
| 143115 ||  || — || December 5, 2002 || Socorro || LINEAR || — || align=right | 1.7 km || 
|-id=116 bgcolor=#E9E9E9
| 143116 ||  || — || December 5, 2002 || Socorro || LINEAR || slow || align=right | 2.5 km || 
|-id=117 bgcolor=#E9E9E9
| 143117 ||  || — || December 5, 2002 || Socorro || LINEAR || — || align=right | 1.4 km || 
|-id=118 bgcolor=#E9E9E9
| 143118 ||  || — || December 5, 2002 || Socorro || LINEAR || HEN || align=right | 1.6 km || 
|-id=119 bgcolor=#d6d6d6
| 143119 ||  || — || December 5, 2002 || Socorro || LINEAR || — || align=right | 4.4 km || 
|-id=120 bgcolor=#fefefe
| 143120 ||  || — || December 5, 2002 || Socorro || LINEAR || V || align=right | 1.4 km || 
|-id=121 bgcolor=#E9E9E9
| 143121 ||  || — || December 5, 2002 || Kitt Peak || Spacewatch || GEF || align=right | 4.0 km || 
|-id=122 bgcolor=#d6d6d6
| 143122 ||  || — || December 6, 2002 || Socorro || LINEAR || — || align=right | 4.2 km || 
|-id=123 bgcolor=#E9E9E9
| 143123 ||  || — || December 6, 2002 || Socorro || LINEAR || WIT || align=right | 1.5 km || 
|-id=124 bgcolor=#E9E9E9
| 143124 ||  || — || December 6, 2002 || Socorro || LINEAR || — || align=right | 2.6 km || 
|-id=125 bgcolor=#E9E9E9
| 143125 ||  || — || December 6, 2002 || Socorro || LINEAR || — || align=right | 1.9 km || 
|-id=126 bgcolor=#E9E9E9
| 143126 ||  || — || December 6, 2002 || Socorro || LINEAR || GEF || align=right | 5.4 km || 
|-id=127 bgcolor=#E9E9E9
| 143127 ||  || — || December 6, 2002 || Socorro || LINEAR || JUN || align=right | 2.3 km || 
|-id=128 bgcolor=#E9E9E9
| 143128 ||  || — || December 5, 2002 || Socorro || LINEAR || — || align=right | 2.9 km || 
|-id=129 bgcolor=#E9E9E9
| 143129 ||  || — || December 5, 2002 || Socorro || LINEAR || — || align=right | 2.3 km || 
|-id=130 bgcolor=#E9E9E9
| 143130 ||  || — || December 5, 2002 || Socorro || LINEAR || HEN || align=right | 1.7 km || 
|-id=131 bgcolor=#d6d6d6
| 143131 ||  || — || December 7, 2002 || Kitt Peak || Spacewatch || — || align=right | 3.6 km || 
|-id=132 bgcolor=#fefefe
| 143132 ||  || — || December 5, 2002 || Socorro || LINEAR || — || align=right | 2.2 km || 
|-id=133 bgcolor=#E9E9E9
| 143133 ||  || — || December 5, 2002 || Socorro || LINEAR || — || align=right | 1.6 km || 
|-id=134 bgcolor=#E9E9E9
| 143134 ||  || — || December 8, 2002 || Palomar || NEAT || BRU || align=right | 3.1 km || 
|-id=135 bgcolor=#d6d6d6
| 143135 ||  || — || December 6, 2002 || Socorro || LINEAR || TRE || align=right | 5.4 km || 
|-id=136 bgcolor=#E9E9E9
| 143136 ||  || — || December 6, 2002 || Socorro || LINEAR || — || align=right | 2.1 km || 
|-id=137 bgcolor=#E9E9E9
| 143137 ||  || — || December 6, 2002 || Socorro || LINEAR || — || align=right | 1.4 km || 
|-id=138 bgcolor=#E9E9E9
| 143138 ||  || — || December 7, 2002 || Socorro || LINEAR || — || align=right | 5.8 km || 
|-id=139 bgcolor=#E9E9E9
| 143139 ||  || — || December 7, 2002 || Ondřejov || P. Pravec, P. Kušnirák || — || align=right | 4.4 km || 
|-id=140 bgcolor=#fefefe
| 143140 ||  || — || December 10, 2002 || Socorro || LINEAR || V || align=right | 1.5 km || 
|-id=141 bgcolor=#E9E9E9
| 143141 ||  || — || December 6, 2002 || Socorro || LINEAR || EUN || align=right | 3.6 km || 
|-id=142 bgcolor=#E9E9E9
| 143142 ||  || — || December 6, 2002 || Socorro || LINEAR || — || align=right | 5.7 km || 
|-id=143 bgcolor=#E9E9E9
| 143143 ||  || — || December 6, 2002 || Socorro || LINEAR || — || align=right | 2.4 km || 
|-id=144 bgcolor=#E9E9E9
| 143144 ||  || — || December 6, 2002 || Socorro || LINEAR || — || align=right | 2.2 km || 
|-id=145 bgcolor=#fefefe
| 143145 ||  || — || December 6, 2002 || Socorro || LINEAR || V || align=right | 1.2 km || 
|-id=146 bgcolor=#E9E9E9
| 143146 ||  || — || December 6, 2002 || Socorro || LINEAR || — || align=right | 5.2 km || 
|-id=147 bgcolor=#E9E9E9
| 143147 ||  || — || December 8, 2002 || Kitt Peak || Spacewatch || — || align=right | 1.9 km || 
|-id=148 bgcolor=#E9E9E9
| 143148 ||  || — || December 6, 2002 || Socorro || LINEAR || MAR || align=right | 1.6 km || 
|-id=149 bgcolor=#E9E9E9
| 143149 ||  || — || December 6, 2002 || Socorro || LINEAR || PAD || align=right | 3.4 km || 
|-id=150 bgcolor=#E9E9E9
| 143150 ||  || — || December 10, 2002 || Socorro || LINEAR || — || align=right | 3.0 km || 
|-id=151 bgcolor=#E9E9E9
| 143151 ||  || — || December 10, 2002 || Palomar || NEAT || — || align=right | 6.7 km || 
|-id=152 bgcolor=#fefefe
| 143152 ||  || — || December 10, 2002 || Socorro || LINEAR || NYS || align=right | 1.0 km || 
|-id=153 bgcolor=#E9E9E9
| 143153 ||  || — || December 10, 2002 || Socorro || LINEAR || — || align=right | 4.2 km || 
|-id=154 bgcolor=#E9E9E9
| 143154 ||  || — || December 10, 2002 || Socorro || LINEAR || — || align=right | 1.7 km || 
|-id=155 bgcolor=#d6d6d6
| 143155 ||  || — || December 10, 2002 || Socorro || LINEAR || KAR || align=right | 1.7 km || 
|-id=156 bgcolor=#E9E9E9
| 143156 ||  || — || December 10, 2002 || Socorro || LINEAR || — || align=right | 1.8 km || 
|-id=157 bgcolor=#E9E9E9
| 143157 ||  || — || December 10, 2002 || Socorro || LINEAR || — || align=right | 4.6 km || 
|-id=158 bgcolor=#E9E9E9
| 143158 ||  || — || December 10, 2002 || Palomar || NEAT || RAF || align=right | 1.5 km || 
|-id=159 bgcolor=#E9E9E9
| 143159 ||  || — || December 10, 2002 || Palomar || NEAT || NEM || align=right | 3.8 km || 
|-id=160 bgcolor=#E9E9E9
| 143160 ||  || — || December 10, 2002 || Palomar || NEAT || — || align=right | 2.5 km || 
|-id=161 bgcolor=#E9E9E9
| 143161 ||  || — || December 8, 2002 || Haleakala || NEAT || RAF || align=right | 2.6 km || 
|-id=162 bgcolor=#d6d6d6
| 143162 ||  || — || December 10, 2002 || Palomar || NEAT || ALA || align=right | 8.1 km || 
|-id=163 bgcolor=#E9E9E9
| 143163 ||  || — || December 11, 2002 || Socorro || LINEAR || — || align=right | 1.5 km || 
|-id=164 bgcolor=#E9E9E9
| 143164 ||  || — || December 11, 2002 || Socorro || LINEAR || — || align=right | 2.3 km || 
|-id=165 bgcolor=#E9E9E9
| 143165 ||  || — || December 11, 2002 || Socorro || LINEAR || — || align=right | 2.9 km || 
|-id=166 bgcolor=#d6d6d6
| 143166 ||  || — || December 10, 2002 || Socorro || LINEAR || — || align=right | 3.8 km || 
|-id=167 bgcolor=#E9E9E9
| 143167 ||  || — || December 10, 2002 || Socorro || LINEAR || RAF || align=right | 4.7 km || 
|-id=168 bgcolor=#E9E9E9
| 143168 ||  || — || December 11, 2002 || Socorro || LINEAR || JUN || align=right | 5.4 km || 
|-id=169 bgcolor=#E9E9E9
| 143169 ||  || — || December 11, 2002 || Socorro || LINEAR || — || align=right | 3.8 km || 
|-id=170 bgcolor=#E9E9E9
| 143170 ||  || — || December 11, 2002 || Socorro || LINEAR || — || align=right | 2.2 km || 
|-id=171 bgcolor=#E9E9E9
| 143171 ||  || — || December 12, 2002 || Socorro || LINEAR || — || align=right | 7.7 km || 
|-id=172 bgcolor=#E9E9E9
| 143172 ||  || — || December 10, 2002 || Kitt Peak || Spacewatch || — || align=right | 2.4 km || 
|-id=173 bgcolor=#E9E9E9
| 143173 ||  || — || December 10, 2002 || Palomar || NEAT || EUN || align=right | 3.4 km || 
|-id=174 bgcolor=#E9E9E9
| 143174 ||  || — || December 11, 2002 || Palomar || NEAT || — || align=right | 1.9 km || 
|-id=175 bgcolor=#E9E9E9
| 143175 ||  || — || December 12, 2002 || Palomar || NEAT || — || align=right | 5.6 km || 
|-id=176 bgcolor=#E9E9E9
| 143176 ||  || — || December 11, 2002 || Socorro || LINEAR || EUN || align=right | 4.1 km || 
|-id=177 bgcolor=#E9E9E9
| 143177 ||  || — || December 11, 2002 || Socorro || LINEAR || — || align=right | 3.9 km || 
|-id=178 bgcolor=#E9E9E9
| 143178 ||  || — || December 11, 2002 || Socorro || LINEAR || — || align=right | 5.0 km || 
|-id=179 bgcolor=#E9E9E9
| 143179 ||  || — || December 11, 2002 || Socorro || LINEAR || — || align=right | 4.6 km || 
|-id=180 bgcolor=#E9E9E9
| 143180 ||  || — || December 11, 2002 || Socorro || LINEAR || — || align=right | 3.8 km || 
|-id=181 bgcolor=#E9E9E9
| 143181 ||  || — || December 11, 2002 || Socorro || LINEAR || — || align=right | 3.7 km || 
|-id=182 bgcolor=#fefefe
| 143182 ||  || — || December 11, 2002 || Socorro || LINEAR || NYS || align=right | 1.1 km || 
|-id=183 bgcolor=#E9E9E9
| 143183 ||  || — || December 11, 2002 || Socorro || LINEAR || — || align=right | 3.5 km || 
|-id=184 bgcolor=#E9E9E9
| 143184 ||  || — || December 11, 2002 || Socorro || LINEAR || — || align=right | 4.0 km || 
|-id=185 bgcolor=#E9E9E9
| 143185 ||  || — || December 11, 2002 || Socorro || LINEAR || — || align=right | 4.6 km || 
|-id=186 bgcolor=#E9E9E9
| 143186 ||  || — || December 11, 2002 || Socorro || LINEAR || — || align=right | 1.5 km || 
|-id=187 bgcolor=#E9E9E9
| 143187 ||  || — || December 11, 2002 || Socorro || LINEAR || — || align=right | 2.5 km || 
|-id=188 bgcolor=#E9E9E9
| 143188 ||  || — || December 11, 2002 || Socorro || LINEAR || — || align=right | 3.8 km || 
|-id=189 bgcolor=#fefefe
| 143189 ||  || — || December 11, 2002 || Socorro || LINEAR || V || align=right | 1.3 km || 
|-id=190 bgcolor=#E9E9E9
| 143190 ||  || — || December 11, 2002 || Socorro || LINEAR || — || align=right | 3.9 km || 
|-id=191 bgcolor=#E9E9E9
| 143191 ||  || — || December 11, 2002 || Socorro || LINEAR || — || align=right | 1.9 km || 
|-id=192 bgcolor=#E9E9E9
| 143192 ||  || — || December 13, 2002 || Palomar || NEAT || — || align=right | 5.2 km || 
|-id=193 bgcolor=#E9E9E9
| 143193 ||  || — || December 13, 2002 || Palomar || NEAT || — || align=right | 1.9 km || 
|-id=194 bgcolor=#d6d6d6
| 143194 ||  || — || December 11, 2002 || Palomar || NEAT || — || align=right | 4.4 km || 
|-id=195 bgcolor=#E9E9E9
| 143195 ||  || — || December 14, 2002 || Socorro || LINEAR || — || align=right | 4.5 km || 
|-id=196 bgcolor=#E9E9E9
| 143196 ||  || — || December 11, 2002 || Socorro || LINEAR || — || align=right | 4.8 km || 
|-id=197 bgcolor=#E9E9E9
| 143197 ||  || — || December 11, 2002 || Socorro || LINEAR || EUN || align=right | 2.4 km || 
|-id=198 bgcolor=#E9E9E9
| 143198 ||  || — || December 11, 2002 || Socorro || LINEAR || — || align=right | 2.0 km || 
|-id=199 bgcolor=#E9E9E9
| 143199 ||  || — || December 11, 2002 || Socorro || LINEAR || — || align=right | 3.4 km || 
|-id=200 bgcolor=#E9E9E9
| 143200 ||  || — || December 12, 2002 || Palomar || NEAT || — || align=right | 4.8 km || 
|}

143201–143300 

|-bgcolor=#d6d6d6
| 143201 ||  || — || December 12, 2002 || Palomar || NEAT || — || align=right | 5.9 km || 
|-id=202 bgcolor=#E9E9E9
| 143202 ||  || — || December 14, 2002 || Socorro || LINEAR || — || align=right | 4.6 km || 
|-id=203 bgcolor=#E9E9E9
| 143203 ||  || — || December 14, 2002 || Socorro || LINEAR || — || align=right | 5.1 km || 
|-id=204 bgcolor=#fefefe
| 143204 ||  || — || December 14, 2002 || Socorro || LINEAR || — || align=right | 4.9 km || 
|-id=205 bgcolor=#fefefe
| 143205 ||  || — || December 5, 2002 || Kitt Peak || M. W. Buie || — || align=right | 1.4 km || 
|-id=206 bgcolor=#E9E9E9
| 143206 ||  || — || December 5, 2002 || Kitt Peak || M. W. Buie || — || align=right | 3.1 km || 
|-id=207 bgcolor=#E9E9E9
| 143207 ||  || — || December 5, 2002 || Socorro || LINEAR || — || align=right | 2.0 km || 
|-id=208 bgcolor=#E9E9E9
| 143208 ||  || — || December 5, 2002 || Socorro || LINEAR || MAR || align=right | 4.5 km || 
|-id=209 bgcolor=#E9E9E9
| 143209 ||  || — || December 5, 2002 || Socorro || LINEAR || — || align=right | 2.1 km || 
|-id=210 bgcolor=#fefefe
| 143210 ||  || — || December 5, 2002 || Socorro || LINEAR || V || align=right | 1.3 km || 
|-id=211 bgcolor=#E9E9E9
| 143211 ||  || — || December 6, 2002 || Socorro || LINEAR || — || align=right | 2.5 km || 
|-id=212 bgcolor=#E9E9E9
| 143212 || 2002 YG || — || December 27, 2002 || Anderson Mesa || LONEOS || — || align=right | 4.2 km || 
|-id=213 bgcolor=#d6d6d6
| 143213 || 2002 YS || — || December 27, 2002 || Anderson Mesa || LONEOS || — || align=right | 6.8 km || 
|-id=214 bgcolor=#fefefe
| 143214 || 2002 YY || — || December 27, 2002 || Anderson Mesa || LONEOS || NYS || align=right | 1.4 km || 
|-id=215 bgcolor=#E9E9E9
| 143215 ||  || — || December 27, 2002 || Anderson Mesa || LONEOS || — || align=right | 5.7 km || 
|-id=216 bgcolor=#E9E9E9
| 143216 ||  || — || December 27, 2002 || Anderson Mesa || LONEOS || — || align=right | 2.2 km || 
|-id=217 bgcolor=#E9E9E9
| 143217 ||  || — || December 28, 2002 || Ametlla de Mar || Ametlla de Mar Obs. || — || align=right | 4.2 km || 
|-id=218 bgcolor=#E9E9E9
| 143218 ||  || — || December 27, 2002 || Anderson Mesa || LONEOS || — || align=right | 2.0 km || 
|-id=219 bgcolor=#fefefe
| 143219 ||  || — || December 28, 2002 || Socorro || LINEAR || — || align=right | 2.1 km || 
|-id=220 bgcolor=#E9E9E9
| 143220 ||  || — || December 28, 2002 || Socorro || LINEAR || BRU || align=right | 4.6 km || 
|-id=221 bgcolor=#E9E9E9
| 143221 ||  || — || December 28, 2002 || Anderson Mesa || LONEOS || — || align=right | 4.8 km || 
|-id=222 bgcolor=#E9E9E9
| 143222 ||  || — || December 31, 2002 || Socorro || LINEAR || — || align=right | 3.7 km || 
|-id=223 bgcolor=#d6d6d6
| 143223 ||  || — || December 30, 2002 || Socorro || LINEAR || ALA || align=right | 6.5 km || 
|-id=224 bgcolor=#E9E9E9
| 143224 ||  || — || December 31, 2002 || Socorro || LINEAR || — || align=right | 1.8 km || 
|-id=225 bgcolor=#E9E9E9
| 143225 ||  || — || December 31, 2002 || Socorro || LINEAR || — || align=right | 3.6 km || 
|-id=226 bgcolor=#fefefe
| 143226 ||  || — || December 31, 2002 || Socorro || LINEAR || NYS || align=right | 1.1 km || 
|-id=227 bgcolor=#E9E9E9
| 143227 ||  || — || December 31, 2002 || Socorro || LINEAR || — || align=right | 2.1 km || 
|-id=228 bgcolor=#E9E9E9
| 143228 ||  || — || December 31, 2002 || Socorro || LINEAR || — || align=right | 1.5 km || 
|-id=229 bgcolor=#fefefe
| 143229 ||  || — || December 31, 2002 || Socorro || LINEAR || — || align=right | 1.3 km || 
|-id=230 bgcolor=#E9E9E9
| 143230 ||  || — || December 31, 2002 || Socorro || LINEAR || — || align=right | 2.0 km || 
|-id=231 bgcolor=#E9E9E9
| 143231 ||  || — || December 31, 2002 || Socorro || LINEAR || — || align=right | 2.4 km || 
|-id=232 bgcolor=#fefefe
| 143232 ||  || — || December 31, 2002 || Socorro || LINEAR || NYS || align=right | 1.4 km || 
|-id=233 bgcolor=#E9E9E9
| 143233 ||  || — || December 31, 2002 || Socorro || LINEAR || — || align=right | 3.0 km || 
|-id=234 bgcolor=#E9E9E9
| 143234 ||  || — || December 31, 2002 || Socorro || LINEAR || — || align=right | 1.8 km || 
|-id=235 bgcolor=#fefefe
| 143235 ||  || — || December 31, 2002 || Socorro || LINEAR || MAS || align=right | 1.3 km || 
|-id=236 bgcolor=#d6d6d6
| 143236 ||  || — || December 31, 2002 || Socorro || LINEAR || — || align=right | 4.8 km || 
|-id=237 bgcolor=#E9E9E9
| 143237 ||  || — || December 31, 2002 || Socorro || LINEAR || — || align=right | 1.9 km || 
|-id=238 bgcolor=#fefefe
| 143238 ||  || — || December 31, 2002 || Socorro || LINEAR || NYS || align=right | 1.3 km || 
|-id=239 bgcolor=#E9E9E9
| 143239 ||  || — || December 31, 2002 || Socorro || LINEAR || — || align=right | 3.9 km || 
|-id=240 bgcolor=#d6d6d6
| 143240 ||  || — || December 31, 2002 || Socorro || LINEAR || — || align=right | 4.3 km || 
|-id=241 bgcolor=#fefefe
| 143241 ||  || — || December 31, 2002 || Socorro || LINEAR || — || align=right | 2.6 km || 
|-id=242 bgcolor=#E9E9E9
| 143242 ||  || — || December 31, 2002 || Socorro || LINEAR || — || align=right | 2.7 km || 
|-id=243 bgcolor=#d6d6d6
| 143243 ||  || — || December 31, 2002 || Socorro || LINEAR || Tj (2.93) || align=right | 9.0 km || 
|-id=244 bgcolor=#E9E9E9
| 143244 ||  || — || December 31, 2002 || Socorro || LINEAR || GEF || align=right | 2.2 km || 
|-id=245 bgcolor=#fefefe
| 143245 ||  || — || December 31, 2002 || Socorro || LINEAR || NYS || align=right | 1.7 km || 
|-id=246 bgcolor=#d6d6d6
| 143246 ||  || — || December 31, 2002 || Socorro || LINEAR || — || align=right | 6.7 km || 
|-id=247 bgcolor=#E9E9E9
| 143247 ||  || — || December 31, 2002 || Socorro || LINEAR || — || align=right | 2.6 km || 
|-id=248 bgcolor=#d6d6d6
| 143248 ||  || — || December 31, 2002 || Socorro || LINEAR || — || align=right | 4.0 km || 
|-id=249 bgcolor=#fefefe
| 143249 ||  || — || December 31, 2002 || Socorro || LINEAR || NYS || align=right | 1.3 km || 
|-id=250 bgcolor=#d6d6d6
| 143250 ||  || — || December 31, 2002 || Socorro || LINEAR || — || align=right | 5.5 km || 
|-id=251 bgcolor=#d6d6d6
| 143251 ||  || — || December 31, 2002 || Socorro || LINEAR || KOR || align=right | 2.4 km || 
|-id=252 bgcolor=#E9E9E9
| 143252 ||  || — || December 31, 2002 || Socorro || LINEAR || GEF || align=right | 2.6 km || 
|-id=253 bgcolor=#fefefe
| 143253 ||  || — || December 31, 2002 || Socorro || LINEAR || NYS || align=right | 1.8 km || 
|-id=254 bgcolor=#E9E9E9
| 143254 ||  || — || December 31, 2002 || Socorro || LINEAR || — || align=right | 2.9 km || 
|-id=255 bgcolor=#E9E9E9
| 143255 ||  || — || December 31, 2002 || Socorro || LINEAR || — || align=right | 1.7 km || 
|-id=256 bgcolor=#E9E9E9
| 143256 ||  || — || December 31, 2002 || Socorro || LINEAR || VIB || align=right | 4.4 km || 
|-id=257 bgcolor=#FA8072
| 143257 || 2003 AE || — || January 1, 2003 || Socorro || LINEAR || — || align=right | 1.4 km || 
|-id=258 bgcolor=#E9E9E9
| 143258 ||  || — || January 2, 2003 || Socorro || LINEAR || — || align=right | 2.6 km || 
|-id=259 bgcolor=#FA8072
| 143259 ||  || — || January 2, 2003 || Socorro || LINEAR || PHO || align=right | 2.1 km || 
|-id=260 bgcolor=#E9E9E9
| 143260 ||  || — || January 1, 2003 || Socorro || LINEAR || — || align=right | 4.6 km || 
|-id=261 bgcolor=#E9E9E9
| 143261 ||  || — || January 2, 2003 || Socorro || LINEAR || RAF || align=right | 2.5 km || 
|-id=262 bgcolor=#E9E9E9
| 143262 ||  || — || January 2, 2003 || Socorro || LINEAR || MAR || align=right | 2.8 km || 
|-id=263 bgcolor=#d6d6d6
| 143263 ||  || — || January 2, 2003 || Socorro || LINEAR || — || align=right | 6.4 km || 
|-id=264 bgcolor=#d6d6d6
| 143264 ||  || — || January 4, 2003 || Kitt Peak || Spacewatch || — || align=right | 5.6 km || 
|-id=265 bgcolor=#d6d6d6
| 143265 ||  || — || January 1, 2003 || Socorro || LINEAR || — || align=right | 5.5 km || 
|-id=266 bgcolor=#E9E9E9
| 143266 ||  || — || January 1, 2003 || Socorro || LINEAR || ADE || align=right | 5.1 km || 
|-id=267 bgcolor=#E9E9E9
| 143267 ||  || — || January 1, 2003 || Socorro || LINEAR || — || align=right | 6.8 km || 
|-id=268 bgcolor=#E9E9E9
| 143268 ||  || — || January 1, 2003 || Socorro || LINEAR || JUN || align=right | 1.9 km || 
|-id=269 bgcolor=#E9E9E9
| 143269 ||  || — || January 1, 2003 || Socorro || LINEAR || RAF || align=right | 2.1 km || 
|-id=270 bgcolor=#E9E9E9
| 143270 ||  || — || January 1, 2003 || Socorro || LINEAR || — || align=right | 4.9 km || 
|-id=271 bgcolor=#fefefe
| 143271 ||  || — || January 2, 2003 || Socorro || LINEAR || — || align=right | 2.6 km || 
|-id=272 bgcolor=#E9E9E9
| 143272 ||  || — || January 2, 2003 || Socorro || LINEAR || — || align=right | 2.8 km || 
|-id=273 bgcolor=#E9E9E9
| 143273 ||  || — || January 2, 2003 || Anderson Mesa || LONEOS || — || align=right | 3.2 km || 
|-id=274 bgcolor=#E9E9E9
| 143274 ||  || — || January 4, 2003 || Socorro || LINEAR || — || align=right | 2.9 km || 
|-id=275 bgcolor=#E9E9E9
| 143275 ||  || — || January 1, 2003 || Socorro || LINEAR || — || align=right | 3.5 km || 
|-id=276 bgcolor=#E9E9E9
| 143276 ||  || — || January 5, 2003 || Anderson Mesa || LONEOS || EUN || align=right | 2.6 km || 
|-id=277 bgcolor=#E9E9E9
| 143277 ||  || — || January 4, 2003 || Anderson Mesa || LONEOS || — || align=right | 2.8 km || 
|-id=278 bgcolor=#d6d6d6
| 143278 ||  || — || January 5, 2003 || Socorro || LINEAR || — || align=right | 5.5 km || 
|-id=279 bgcolor=#E9E9E9
| 143279 ||  || — || January 4, 2003 || Socorro || LINEAR || — || align=right | 2.5 km || 
|-id=280 bgcolor=#E9E9E9
| 143280 ||  || — || January 4, 2003 || Socorro || LINEAR || — || align=right | 2.1 km || 
|-id=281 bgcolor=#fefefe
| 143281 ||  || — || January 4, 2003 || Socorro || LINEAR || V || align=right | 1.3 km || 
|-id=282 bgcolor=#fefefe
| 143282 ||  || — || January 4, 2003 || Socorro || LINEAR || — || align=right | 2.9 km || 
|-id=283 bgcolor=#d6d6d6
| 143283 ||  || — || January 4, 2003 || Socorro || LINEAR || 7:4 || align=right | 8.1 km || 
|-id=284 bgcolor=#fefefe
| 143284 ||  || — || January 4, 2003 || Socorro || LINEAR || MAS || align=right | 1.5 km || 
|-id=285 bgcolor=#E9E9E9
| 143285 ||  || — || January 4, 2003 || Socorro || LINEAR || — || align=right | 3.9 km || 
|-id=286 bgcolor=#E9E9E9
| 143286 ||  || — || January 4, 2003 || Socorro || LINEAR || — || align=right | 4.2 km || 
|-id=287 bgcolor=#d6d6d6
| 143287 ||  || — || January 4, 2003 || Socorro || LINEAR || — || align=right | 4.4 km || 
|-id=288 bgcolor=#d6d6d6
| 143288 ||  || — || January 5, 2003 || Socorro || LINEAR || — || align=right | 4.3 km || 
|-id=289 bgcolor=#E9E9E9
| 143289 ||  || — || January 5, 2003 || Socorro || LINEAR || — || align=right | 1.5 km || 
|-id=290 bgcolor=#d6d6d6
| 143290 ||  || — || January 5, 2003 || Kitt Peak || Spacewatch || EOS || align=right | 5.3 km || 
|-id=291 bgcolor=#fefefe
| 143291 ||  || — || January 5, 2003 || Socorro || LINEAR || — || align=right | 1.8 km || 
|-id=292 bgcolor=#fefefe
| 143292 ||  || — || January 7, 2003 || Socorro || LINEAR || — || align=right | 1.6 km || 
|-id=293 bgcolor=#E9E9E9
| 143293 ||  || — || January 7, 2003 || Socorro || LINEAR || — || align=right | 2.1 km || 
|-id=294 bgcolor=#E9E9E9
| 143294 ||  || — || January 7, 2003 || Socorro || LINEAR || — || align=right | 2.2 km || 
|-id=295 bgcolor=#E9E9E9
| 143295 ||  || — || January 7, 2003 || Socorro || LINEAR || MIT || align=right | 4.8 km || 
|-id=296 bgcolor=#E9E9E9
| 143296 ||  || — || January 7, 2003 || Socorro || LINEAR || — || align=right | 2.0 km || 
|-id=297 bgcolor=#fefefe
| 143297 ||  || — || January 7, 2003 || Socorro || LINEAR || NYS || align=right | 1.3 km || 
|-id=298 bgcolor=#E9E9E9
| 143298 ||  || — || January 7, 2003 || Socorro || LINEAR || — || align=right | 3.2 km || 
|-id=299 bgcolor=#fefefe
| 143299 ||  || — || January 7, 2003 || Socorro || LINEAR || — || align=right | 1.4 km || 
|-id=300 bgcolor=#E9E9E9
| 143300 ||  || — || January 7, 2003 || Socorro || LINEAR || — || align=right | 3.6 km || 
|}

143301–143400 

|-bgcolor=#E9E9E9
| 143301 ||  || — || January 7, 2003 || Socorro || LINEAR || MRX || align=right | 1.4 km || 
|-id=302 bgcolor=#d6d6d6
| 143302 ||  || — || January 7, 2003 || Socorro || LINEAR || — || align=right | 4.0 km || 
|-id=303 bgcolor=#FA8072
| 143303 ||  || — || January 7, 2003 || Socorro || LINEAR || — || align=right | 4.2 km || 
|-id=304 bgcolor=#d6d6d6
| 143304 ||  || — || January 7, 2003 || Socorro || LINEAR || — || align=right | 5.9 km || 
|-id=305 bgcolor=#E9E9E9
| 143305 ||  || — || January 7, 2003 || Socorro || LINEAR || — || align=right | 2.7 km || 
|-id=306 bgcolor=#d6d6d6
| 143306 ||  || — || January 7, 2003 || Socorro || LINEAR || — || align=right | 4.7 km || 
|-id=307 bgcolor=#E9E9E9
| 143307 ||  || — || January 7, 2003 || Socorro || LINEAR || — || align=right | 1.8 km || 
|-id=308 bgcolor=#fefefe
| 143308 ||  || — || January 7, 2003 || Socorro || LINEAR || V || align=right | 1.2 km || 
|-id=309 bgcolor=#fefefe
| 143309 ||  || — || January 7, 2003 || Socorro || LINEAR || — || align=right | 1.4 km || 
|-id=310 bgcolor=#E9E9E9
| 143310 ||  || — || January 5, 2003 || Socorro || LINEAR || — || align=right | 5.7 km || 
|-id=311 bgcolor=#E9E9E9
| 143311 ||  || — || January 5, 2003 || Socorro || LINEAR || — || align=right | 1.9 km || 
|-id=312 bgcolor=#E9E9E9
| 143312 ||  || — || January 5, 2003 || Socorro || LINEAR || — || align=right | 2.3 km || 
|-id=313 bgcolor=#d6d6d6
| 143313 ||  || — || January 5, 2003 || Socorro || LINEAR || EOS || align=right | 4.9 km || 
|-id=314 bgcolor=#E9E9E9
| 143314 ||  || — || January 5, 2003 || Socorro || LINEAR || — || align=right | 2.2 km || 
|-id=315 bgcolor=#d6d6d6
| 143315 ||  || — || January 5, 2003 || Socorro || LINEAR || EOS || align=right | 3.7 km || 
|-id=316 bgcolor=#E9E9E9
| 143316 ||  || — || January 5, 2003 || Socorro || LINEAR || — || align=right | 3.2 km || 
|-id=317 bgcolor=#E9E9E9
| 143317 ||  || — || January 5, 2003 || Socorro || LINEAR || AGN || align=right | 2.0 km || 
|-id=318 bgcolor=#E9E9E9
| 143318 ||  || — || January 5, 2003 || Socorro || LINEAR || — || align=right | 3.9 km || 
|-id=319 bgcolor=#E9E9E9
| 143319 ||  || — || January 5, 2003 || Socorro || LINEAR || HOF || align=right | 4.9 km || 
|-id=320 bgcolor=#d6d6d6
| 143320 ||  || — || January 5, 2003 || Socorro || LINEAR || URS || align=right | 6.6 km || 
|-id=321 bgcolor=#E9E9E9
| 143321 ||  || — || January 5, 2003 || Socorro || LINEAR || — || align=right | 3.4 km || 
|-id=322 bgcolor=#d6d6d6
| 143322 ||  || — || January 5, 2003 || Socorro || LINEAR || — || align=right | 4.1 km || 
|-id=323 bgcolor=#E9E9E9
| 143323 ||  || — || January 5, 2003 || Socorro || LINEAR || — || align=right | 2.3 km || 
|-id=324 bgcolor=#E9E9E9
| 143324 ||  || — || January 7, 2003 || Socorro || LINEAR || — || align=right | 2.2 km || 
|-id=325 bgcolor=#d6d6d6
| 143325 ||  || — || January 7, 2003 || Socorro || LINEAR || — || align=right | 5.0 km || 
|-id=326 bgcolor=#d6d6d6
| 143326 ||  || — || January 8, 2003 || Socorro || LINEAR || — || align=right | 5.9 km || 
|-id=327 bgcolor=#d6d6d6
| 143327 ||  || — || January 8, 2003 || Socorro || LINEAR || EOS || align=right | 4.0 km || 
|-id=328 bgcolor=#E9E9E9
| 143328 ||  || — || January 7, 2003 || Socorro || LINEAR || — || align=right | 2.0 km || 
|-id=329 bgcolor=#E9E9E9
| 143329 ||  || — || January 7, 2003 || Socorro || LINEAR || INO || align=right | 1.8 km || 
|-id=330 bgcolor=#E9E9E9
| 143330 ||  || — || January 7, 2003 || Socorro || LINEAR || — || align=right | 3.8 km || 
|-id=331 bgcolor=#d6d6d6
| 143331 ||  || — || January 7, 2003 || Socorro || LINEAR || — || align=right | 4.8 km || 
|-id=332 bgcolor=#E9E9E9
| 143332 ||  || — || January 7, 2003 || Socorro || LINEAR || — || align=right | 1.7 km || 
|-id=333 bgcolor=#d6d6d6
| 143333 ||  || — || January 7, 2003 || Socorro || LINEAR || — || align=right | 3.3 km || 
|-id=334 bgcolor=#d6d6d6
| 143334 ||  || — || January 10, 2003 || Socorro || LINEAR || TIR || align=right | 4.9 km || 
|-id=335 bgcolor=#E9E9E9
| 143335 ||  || — || January 10, 2003 || Socorro || LINEAR || KAZ || align=right | 2.5 km || 
|-id=336 bgcolor=#E9E9E9
| 143336 ||  || — || January 10, 2003 || Socorro || LINEAR || GEF || align=right | 2.1 km || 
|-id=337 bgcolor=#E9E9E9
| 143337 ||  || — || January 10, 2003 || Socorro || LINEAR || — || align=right | 5.2 km || 
|-id=338 bgcolor=#E9E9E9
| 143338 ||  || — || January 10, 2003 || Socorro || LINEAR || — || align=right | 3.8 km || 
|-id=339 bgcolor=#E9E9E9
| 143339 ||  || — || January 10, 2003 || Socorro || LINEAR || — || align=right | 3.2 km || 
|-id=340 bgcolor=#E9E9E9
| 143340 ||  || — || January 10, 2003 || Socorro || LINEAR || DOR || align=right | 8.4 km || 
|-id=341 bgcolor=#E9E9E9
| 143341 ||  || — || January 10, 2003 || Socorro || LINEAR || — || align=right | 5.8 km || 
|-id=342 bgcolor=#E9E9E9
| 143342 ||  || — || January 10, 2003 || Socorro || LINEAR || — || align=right | 3.3 km || 
|-id=343 bgcolor=#E9E9E9
| 143343 ||  || — || January 10, 2003 || Socorro || LINEAR || DOR || align=right | 4.9 km || 
|-id=344 bgcolor=#d6d6d6
| 143344 ||  || — || January 10, 2003 || Socorro || LINEAR || — || align=right | 5.7 km || 
|-id=345 bgcolor=#E9E9E9
| 143345 ||  || — || January 10, 2003 || Socorro || LINEAR || — || align=right | 1.9 km || 
|-id=346 bgcolor=#E9E9E9
| 143346 ||  || — || January 10, 2003 || Kitt Peak || Spacewatch || — || align=right | 3.9 km || 
|-id=347 bgcolor=#E9E9E9
| 143347 ||  || — || January 11, 2003 || Socorro || LINEAR || — || align=right | 3.5 km || 
|-id=348 bgcolor=#E9E9E9
| 143348 ||  || — || January 12, 2003 || Anderson Mesa || LONEOS || — || align=right | 3.0 km || 
|-id=349 bgcolor=#E9E9E9
| 143349 ||  || — || January 10, 2003 || Socorro || LINEAR || ADE || align=right | 5.8 km || 
|-id=350 bgcolor=#E9E9E9
| 143350 ||  || — || January 12, 2003 || Anderson Mesa || LONEOS || — || align=right | 4.8 km || 
|-id=351 bgcolor=#E9E9E9
| 143351 ||  || — || January 11, 2003 || Kitt Peak || Spacewatch || — || align=right | 1.2 km || 
|-id=352 bgcolor=#d6d6d6
| 143352 ||  || — || January 7, 2003 || Kitt Peak || DLS || — || align=right | 4.3 km || 
|-id=353 bgcolor=#E9E9E9
| 143353 ||  || — || January 1, 2003 || Socorro || LINEAR || — || align=right | 1.7 km || 
|-id=354 bgcolor=#d6d6d6
| 143354 ||  || — || January 1, 2003 || Socorro || LINEAR || — || align=right | 6.2 km || 
|-id=355 bgcolor=#d6d6d6
| 143355 ||  || — || January 2, 2003 || Socorro || LINEAR || — || align=right | 6.3 km || 
|-id=356 bgcolor=#d6d6d6
| 143356 ||  || — || January 7, 2003 || Socorro || LINEAR || — || align=right | 7.4 km || 
|-id=357 bgcolor=#E9E9E9
| 143357 ||  || — || January 10, 2003 || Goodricke-Pigott || Goodricke-Pigott Obs. || — || align=right | 3.9 km || 
|-id=358 bgcolor=#fefefe
| 143358 || 2003 BF || — || January 18, 2003 || Palomar || NEAT || — || align=right | 2.7 km || 
|-id=359 bgcolor=#E9E9E9
| 143359 || 2003 BV || — || January 24, 2003 || Palomar || NEAT || — || align=right | 6.1 km || 
|-id=360 bgcolor=#fefefe
| 143360 ||  || — || January 25, 2003 || Anderson Mesa || LONEOS || NYS || align=right | 1.4 km || 
|-id=361 bgcolor=#E9E9E9
| 143361 ||  || — || January 26, 2003 || Kitt Peak || Spacewatch || — || align=right | 2.1 km || 
|-id=362 bgcolor=#d6d6d6
| 143362 ||  || — || January 23, 2003 || Kvistaberg || UDAS || — || align=right | 6.9 km || 
|-id=363 bgcolor=#d6d6d6
| 143363 ||  || — || January 24, 2003 || Palomar || NEAT || — || align=right | 5.1 km || 
|-id=364 bgcolor=#E9E9E9
| 143364 ||  || — || January 24, 2003 || Palomar || NEAT || — || align=right | 5.2 km || 
|-id=365 bgcolor=#E9E9E9
| 143365 ||  || — || January 25, 2003 || Anderson Mesa || LONEOS || — || align=right | 3.9 km || 
|-id=366 bgcolor=#E9E9E9
| 143366 ||  || — || January 25, 2003 || Palomar || NEAT || — || align=right | 2.9 km || 
|-id=367 bgcolor=#E9E9E9
| 143367 ||  || — || January 26, 2003 || Palomar || NEAT || EUN || align=right | 2.2 km || 
|-id=368 bgcolor=#d6d6d6
| 143368 ||  || — || January 26, 2003 || Anderson Mesa || LONEOS || HYG || align=right | 5.5 km || 
|-id=369 bgcolor=#d6d6d6
| 143369 ||  || — || January 26, 2003 || Anderson Mesa || LONEOS || — || align=right | 6.6 km || 
|-id=370 bgcolor=#fefefe
| 143370 ||  || — || January 26, 2003 || Palomar || NEAT || NYS || align=right | 1.2 km || 
|-id=371 bgcolor=#d6d6d6
| 143371 ||  || — || January 26, 2003 || Anderson Mesa || LONEOS || EOS || align=right | 3.8 km || 
|-id=372 bgcolor=#d6d6d6
| 143372 ||  || — || January 26, 2003 || Anderson Mesa || LONEOS || EOS || align=right | 3.7 km || 
|-id=373 bgcolor=#E9E9E9
| 143373 ||  || — || January 26, 2003 || Anderson Mesa || LONEOS || — || align=right | 3.7 km || 
|-id=374 bgcolor=#fefefe
| 143374 ||  || — || January 26, 2003 || Haleakala || NEAT || NYS || align=right | 1.7 km || 
|-id=375 bgcolor=#d6d6d6
| 143375 ||  || — || January 26, 2003 || Haleakala || NEAT || — || align=right | 5.8 km || 
|-id=376 bgcolor=#d6d6d6
| 143376 ||  || — || January 26, 2003 || Haleakala || NEAT || — || align=right | 6.5 km || 
|-id=377 bgcolor=#d6d6d6
| 143377 ||  || — || January 26, 2003 || Haleakala || NEAT || — || align=right | 5.3 km || 
|-id=378 bgcolor=#E9E9E9
| 143378 ||  || — || January 26, 2003 || Haleakala || NEAT || — || align=right | 3.8 km || 
|-id=379 bgcolor=#E9E9E9
| 143379 ||  || — || January 27, 2003 || Socorro || LINEAR || — || align=right | 1.7 km || 
|-id=380 bgcolor=#d6d6d6
| 143380 ||  || — || January 26, 2003 || Anderson Mesa || LONEOS || — || align=right | 4.2 km || 
|-id=381 bgcolor=#FFC2E0
| 143381 ||  || — || January 27, 2003 || Haleakala || NEAT || AMO +1km || align=right | 2.2 km || 
|-id=382 bgcolor=#fefefe
| 143382 ||  || — || January 27, 2003 || Anderson Mesa || LONEOS || — || align=right | 1.6 km || 
|-id=383 bgcolor=#d6d6d6
| 143383 ||  || — || January 25, 2003 || Palomar || NEAT || — || align=right | 5.0 km || 
|-id=384 bgcolor=#d6d6d6
| 143384 ||  || — || January 25, 2003 || Palomar || NEAT || EOS || align=right | 3.2 km || 
|-id=385 bgcolor=#E9E9E9
| 143385 ||  || — || January 26, 2003 || Palomar || NEAT || EUN || align=right | 2.6 km || 
|-id=386 bgcolor=#d6d6d6
| 143386 ||  || — || January 26, 2003 || Palomar || NEAT || IMH || align=right | 6.9 km || 
|-id=387 bgcolor=#E9E9E9
| 143387 ||  || — || January 26, 2003 || Palomar || NEAT || JUN || align=right | 1.7 km || 
|-id=388 bgcolor=#d6d6d6
| 143388 ||  || — || January 26, 2003 || Palomar || NEAT || — || align=right | 4.3 km || 
|-id=389 bgcolor=#d6d6d6
| 143389 ||  || — || January 26, 2003 || Anderson Mesa || LONEOS || — || align=right | 5.8 km || 
|-id=390 bgcolor=#E9E9E9
| 143390 ||  || — || January 26, 2003 || Anderson Mesa || LONEOS || — || align=right | 1.8 km || 
|-id=391 bgcolor=#E9E9E9
| 143391 ||  || — || January 26, 2003 || Haleakala || NEAT || DOR || align=right | 4.7 km || 
|-id=392 bgcolor=#E9E9E9
| 143392 ||  || — || January 27, 2003 || Anderson Mesa || LONEOS || ADE || align=right | 4.1 km || 
|-id=393 bgcolor=#E9E9E9
| 143393 ||  || — || January 27, 2003 || Socorro || LINEAR || — || align=right | 2.1 km || 
|-id=394 bgcolor=#d6d6d6
| 143394 ||  || — || January 27, 2003 || Anderson Mesa || LONEOS || — || align=right | 3.9 km || 
|-id=395 bgcolor=#d6d6d6
| 143395 ||  || — || January 27, 2003 || Socorro || LINEAR || — || align=right | 5.8 km || 
|-id=396 bgcolor=#d6d6d6
| 143396 ||  || — || January 27, 2003 || Socorro || LINEAR || — || align=right | 3.9 km || 
|-id=397 bgcolor=#fefefe
| 143397 ||  || — || January 27, 2003 || Palomar || NEAT || FLO || align=right data-sort-value="0.96" | 960 m || 
|-id=398 bgcolor=#d6d6d6
| 143398 ||  || — || January 25, 2003 || La Silla || A. Boattini, H. Scholl || EOS || align=right | 3.4 km || 
|-id=399 bgcolor=#d6d6d6
| 143399 ||  || — || January 27, 2003 || Anderson Mesa || LONEOS || CHA || align=right | 3.7 km || 
|-id=400 bgcolor=#d6d6d6
| 143400 ||  || — || January 27, 2003 || Socorro || LINEAR || — || align=right | 4.3 km || 
|}

143401–143500 

|-bgcolor=#d6d6d6
| 143401 ||  || — || January 28, 2003 || Kitt Peak || Spacewatch || — || align=right | 5.9 km || 
|-id=402 bgcolor=#d6d6d6
| 143402 ||  || — || January 28, 2003 || Socorro || LINEAR || ALA || align=right | 6.1 km || 
|-id=403 bgcolor=#d6d6d6
| 143403 ||  || — || January 29, 2003 || Palomar || NEAT || NAE || align=right | 3.9 km || 
|-id=404 bgcolor=#FFC2E0
| 143404 ||  || — || January 30, 2003 || Anderson Mesa || LONEOS || APO +1kmPHA || align=right | 1.5 km || 
|-id=405 bgcolor=#E9E9E9
| 143405 ||  || — || January 26, 2003 || Palomar || NEAT || EUN || align=right | 2.6 km || 
|-id=406 bgcolor=#fefefe
| 143406 ||  || — || January 27, 2003 || Anderson Mesa || LONEOS || NYS || align=right | 2.9 km || 
|-id=407 bgcolor=#d6d6d6
| 143407 ||  || — || January 28, 2003 || Haleakala || NEAT || — || align=right | 3.4 km || 
|-id=408 bgcolor=#E9E9E9
| 143408 ||  || — || January 29, 2003 || Kitt Peak || Spacewatch || — || align=right | 2.8 km || 
|-id=409 bgcolor=#FFC2E0
| 143409 ||  || — || January 28, 2003 || Socorro || LINEAR || AMO +1km || align=right data-sort-value="0.97" | 970 m || 
|-id=410 bgcolor=#E9E9E9
| 143410 ||  || — || January 30, 2003 || Socorro || LINEAR || BRU || align=right | 6.0 km || 
|-id=411 bgcolor=#d6d6d6
| 143411 ||  || — || January 26, 2003 || Anderson Mesa || LONEOS || 7:4 || align=right | 5.1 km || 
|-id=412 bgcolor=#d6d6d6
| 143412 ||  || — || January 26, 2003 || Kitt Peak || Spacewatch || — || align=right | 4.1 km || 
|-id=413 bgcolor=#d6d6d6
| 143413 ||  || — || January 26, 2003 || Haleakala || NEAT || 7:4 || align=right | 9.3 km || 
|-id=414 bgcolor=#E9E9E9
| 143414 ||  || — || January 27, 2003 || Socorro || LINEAR || GEF || align=right | 2.0 km || 
|-id=415 bgcolor=#d6d6d6
| 143415 ||  || — || January 27, 2003 || Socorro || LINEAR || — || align=right | 4.5 km || 
|-id=416 bgcolor=#E9E9E9
| 143416 ||  || — || January 27, 2003 || Socorro || LINEAR || — || align=right | 1.5 km || 
|-id=417 bgcolor=#d6d6d6
| 143417 ||  || — || January 27, 2003 || Socorro || LINEAR || — || align=right | 7.0 km || 
|-id=418 bgcolor=#E9E9E9
| 143418 ||  || — || January 27, 2003 || Anderson Mesa || LONEOS || DOR || align=right | 5.3 km || 
|-id=419 bgcolor=#E9E9E9
| 143419 ||  || — || January 27, 2003 || Anderson Mesa || LONEOS || HOF || align=right | 5.1 km || 
|-id=420 bgcolor=#d6d6d6
| 143420 ||  || — || January 28, 2003 || Kitt Peak || Spacewatch || — || align=right | 4.9 km || 
|-id=421 bgcolor=#E9E9E9
| 143421 ||  || — || January 28, 2003 || Haleakala || NEAT || MRX || align=right | 1.8 km || 
|-id=422 bgcolor=#d6d6d6
| 143422 ||  || — || January 28, 2003 || Haleakala || NEAT || VER || align=right | 6.1 km || 
|-id=423 bgcolor=#d6d6d6
| 143423 ||  || — || January 28, 2003 || Haleakala || NEAT || BRA || align=right | 2.4 km || 
|-id=424 bgcolor=#d6d6d6
| 143424 ||  || — || January 27, 2003 || Socorro || LINEAR || — || align=right | 5.4 km || 
|-id=425 bgcolor=#d6d6d6
| 143425 ||  || — || January 27, 2003 || Socorro || LINEAR || — || align=right | 4.4 km || 
|-id=426 bgcolor=#d6d6d6
| 143426 ||  || — || January 27, 2003 || Socorro || LINEAR || — || align=right | 4.9 km || 
|-id=427 bgcolor=#fefefe
| 143427 ||  || — || January 27, 2003 || Socorro || LINEAR || MAS || align=right | 1.6 km || 
|-id=428 bgcolor=#d6d6d6
| 143428 ||  || — || January 27, 2003 || Socorro || LINEAR || EMA || align=right | 4.4 km || 
|-id=429 bgcolor=#d6d6d6
| 143429 ||  || — || January 27, 2003 || Socorro || LINEAR || THM || align=right | 4.5 km || 
|-id=430 bgcolor=#E9E9E9
| 143430 ||  || — || January 27, 2003 || Socorro || LINEAR || — || align=right | 2.6 km || 
|-id=431 bgcolor=#E9E9E9
| 143431 ||  || — || January 28, 2003 || Palomar || NEAT || — || align=right | 4.8 km || 
|-id=432 bgcolor=#E9E9E9
| 143432 ||  || — || January 28, 2003 || Palomar || NEAT || — || align=right | 6.1 km || 
|-id=433 bgcolor=#E9E9E9
| 143433 ||  || — || January 28, 2003 || Palomar || NEAT || — || align=right | 2.7 km || 
|-id=434 bgcolor=#d6d6d6
| 143434 ||  || — || January 28, 2003 || Socorro || LINEAR || EOS || align=right | 3.6 km || 
|-id=435 bgcolor=#E9E9E9
| 143435 ||  || — || January 29, 2003 || Palomar || NEAT || ADE || align=right | 4.9 km || 
|-id=436 bgcolor=#d6d6d6
| 143436 ||  || — || January 30, 2003 || Anderson Mesa || LONEOS || — || align=right | 4.7 km || 
|-id=437 bgcolor=#d6d6d6
| 143437 ||  || — || January 30, 2003 || Anderson Mesa || LONEOS || — || align=right | 5.5 km || 
|-id=438 bgcolor=#d6d6d6
| 143438 ||  || — || January 30, 2003 || Haleakala || NEAT || — || align=right | 5.1 km || 
|-id=439 bgcolor=#E9E9E9
| 143439 ||  || — || January 27, 2003 || Anderson Mesa || LONEOS || — || align=right | 3.3 km || 
|-id=440 bgcolor=#d6d6d6
| 143440 ||  || — || January 31, 2003 || Kitt Peak || Spacewatch || THM || align=right | 2.9 km || 
|-id=441 bgcolor=#d6d6d6
| 143441 ||  || — || January 28, 2003 || Palomar || NEAT || VER || align=right | 5.2 km || 
|-id=442 bgcolor=#E9E9E9
| 143442 ||  || — || January 29, 2003 || Socorro || LINEAR || — || align=right | 2.4 km || 
|-id=443 bgcolor=#d6d6d6
| 143443 ||  || — || January 29, 2003 || Palomar || NEAT || — || align=right | 5.4 km || 
|-id=444 bgcolor=#E9E9E9
| 143444 ||  || — || January 29, 2003 || Palomar || NEAT || DOR || align=right | 4.2 km || 
|-id=445 bgcolor=#d6d6d6
| 143445 ||  || — || January 29, 2003 || Palomar || NEAT || — || align=right | 3.7 km || 
|-id=446 bgcolor=#d6d6d6
| 143446 ||  || — || January 29, 2003 || Palomar || NEAT || — || align=right | 5.7 km || 
|-id=447 bgcolor=#d6d6d6
| 143447 ||  || — || January 31, 2003 || Socorro || LINEAR || TEL || align=right | 2.3 km || 
|-id=448 bgcolor=#E9E9E9
| 143448 ||  || — || January 31, 2003 || Palomar || NEAT || — || align=right | 1.5 km || 
|-id=449 bgcolor=#d6d6d6
| 143449 ||  || — || January 31, 2003 || Anderson Mesa || LONEOS || EOS || align=right | 3.8 km || 
|-id=450 bgcolor=#E9E9E9
| 143450 ||  || — || January 31, 2003 || Socorro || LINEAR || GEF || align=right | 2.7 km || 
|-id=451 bgcolor=#E9E9E9
| 143451 ||  || — || January 31, 2003 || Socorro || LINEAR || — || align=right | 4.5 km || 
|-id=452 bgcolor=#E9E9E9
| 143452 ||  || — || January 31, 2003 || Socorro || LINEAR || — || align=right | 4.3 km || 
|-id=453 bgcolor=#E9E9E9
| 143453 ||  || — || January 31, 2003 || Socorro || LINEAR || — || align=right | 3.8 km || 
|-id=454 bgcolor=#d6d6d6
| 143454 ||  || — || January 31, 2003 || Socorro || LINEAR || — || align=right | 4.1 km || 
|-id=455 bgcolor=#d6d6d6
| 143455 ||  || — || January 31, 2003 || Socorro || LINEAR || — || align=right | 5.5 km || 
|-id=456 bgcolor=#d6d6d6
| 143456 ||  || — || January 31, 2003 || Socorro || LINEAR || EOS || align=right | 4.0 km || 
|-id=457 bgcolor=#d6d6d6
| 143457 ||  || — || January 31, 2003 || Goodricke-Pigott || J. W. Kessel || EOS || align=right | 3.3 km || 
|-id=458 bgcolor=#d6d6d6
| 143458 ||  || — || January 24, 2003 || La Silla || La Silla Obs. || — || align=right | 5.0 km || 
|-id=459 bgcolor=#E9E9E9
| 143459 ||  || — || January 27, 2003 || Socorro || LINEAR || — || align=right | 5.4 km || 
|-id=460 bgcolor=#E9E9E9
| 143460 ||  || — || January 27, 2003 || Socorro || LINEAR || EUN || align=right | 2.2 km || 
|-id=461 bgcolor=#d6d6d6
| 143461 ||  || — || January 28, 2003 || Socorro || LINEAR || LUT || align=right | 6.6 km || 
|-id=462 bgcolor=#d6d6d6
| 143462 ||  || — || January 28, 2003 || Socorro || LINEAR || — || align=right | 5.7 km || 
|-id=463 bgcolor=#E9E9E9
| 143463 ||  || — || January 28, 2003 || Socorro || LINEAR || — || align=right | 1.7 km || 
|-id=464 bgcolor=#d6d6d6
| 143464 ||  || — || January 31, 2003 || Socorro || LINEAR || TIR || align=right | 5.8 km || 
|-id=465 bgcolor=#E9E9E9
| 143465 || 2003 CT || — || February 1, 2003 || Palomar || NEAT || EUN || align=right | 4.9 km || 
|-id=466 bgcolor=#d6d6d6
| 143466 ||  || — || February 2, 2003 || Socorro || LINEAR || BRA || align=right | 3.6 km || 
|-id=467 bgcolor=#E9E9E9
| 143467 ||  || — || February 2, 2003 || Socorro || LINEAR || — || align=right | 2.3 km || 
|-id=468 bgcolor=#d6d6d6
| 143468 ||  || — || February 1, 2003 || Palomar || NEAT || ALA || align=right | 6.6 km || 
|-id=469 bgcolor=#E9E9E9
| 143469 ||  || — || February 3, 2003 || Palomar || NEAT || HNS || align=right | 2.3 km || 
|-id=470 bgcolor=#d6d6d6
| 143470 ||  || — || February 1, 2003 || Socorro || LINEAR || NAE || align=right | 5.8 km || 
|-id=471 bgcolor=#d6d6d6
| 143471 ||  || — || February 1, 2003 || Socorro || LINEAR || EOS || align=right | 3.7 km || 
|-id=472 bgcolor=#d6d6d6
| 143472 ||  || — || February 1, 2003 || Socorro || LINEAR || HYG || align=right | 5.3 km || 
|-id=473 bgcolor=#E9E9E9
| 143473 ||  || — || February 1, 2003 || Socorro || LINEAR || — || align=right | 1.8 km || 
|-id=474 bgcolor=#d6d6d6
| 143474 ||  || — || February 1, 2003 || Socorro || LINEAR || HYG || align=right | 5.9 km || 
|-id=475 bgcolor=#E9E9E9
| 143475 ||  || — || February 1, 2003 || Socorro || LINEAR || — || align=right | 1.8 km || 
|-id=476 bgcolor=#d6d6d6
| 143476 ||  || — || February 2, 2003 || Anderson Mesa || LONEOS || EOS || align=right | 3.3 km || 
|-id=477 bgcolor=#fefefe
| 143477 ||  || — || February 2, 2003 || Haleakala || NEAT || — || align=right | 3.4 km || 
|-id=478 bgcolor=#E9E9E9
| 143478 ||  || — || February 2, 2003 || Socorro || LINEAR || — || align=right | 1.9 km || 
|-id=479 bgcolor=#d6d6d6
| 143479 ||  || — || February 3, 2003 || Palomar || NEAT || — || align=right | 4.2 km || 
|-id=480 bgcolor=#d6d6d6
| 143480 ||  || — || February 3, 2003 || Anderson Mesa || LONEOS || EOS || align=right | 3.7 km || 
|-id=481 bgcolor=#d6d6d6
| 143481 ||  || — || February 3, 2003 || Haleakala || NEAT || — || align=right | 8.0 km || 
|-id=482 bgcolor=#d6d6d6
| 143482 ||  || — || February 2, 2003 || Palomar || NEAT || — || align=right | 3.7 km || 
|-id=483 bgcolor=#d6d6d6
| 143483 ||  || — || February 3, 2003 || Palomar || NEAT || — || align=right | 6.0 km || 
|-id=484 bgcolor=#E9E9E9
| 143484 ||  || — || February 3, 2003 || Kitt Peak || Spacewatch || AGN || align=right | 1.8 km || 
|-id=485 bgcolor=#E9E9E9
| 143485 ||  || — || February 3, 2003 || Haleakala || NEAT || — || align=right | 2.1 km || 
|-id=486 bgcolor=#d6d6d6
| 143486 ||  || — || February 4, 2003 || Anderson Mesa || LONEOS || — || align=right | 9.4 km || 
|-id=487 bgcolor=#FFC2E0
| 143487 ||  || — || February 11, 2003 || Haleakala || NEAT || APOPHAcritical || align=right data-sort-value="0.65" | 650 m || 
|-id=488 bgcolor=#d6d6d6
| 143488 ||  || — || February 3, 2003 || Socorro || LINEAR || — || align=right | 3.3 km || 
|-id=489 bgcolor=#d6d6d6
| 143489 || 2003 DS || — || February 21, 2003 || Palomar || NEAT || EOS || align=right | 3.3 km || 
|-id=490 bgcolor=#d6d6d6
| 143490 ||  || — || February 22, 2003 || Palomar || NEAT || — || align=right | 4.6 km || 
|-id=491 bgcolor=#d6d6d6
| 143491 ||  || — || February 22, 2003 || Palomar || NEAT || — || align=right | 4.7 km || 
|-id=492 bgcolor=#d6d6d6
| 143492 ||  || — || February 22, 2003 || Kleť || Kleť Obs. || — || align=right | 4.8 km || 
|-id=493 bgcolor=#E9E9E9
| 143493 ||  || — || February 19, 2003 || Palomar || NEAT || — || align=right | 4.1 km || 
|-id=494 bgcolor=#d6d6d6
| 143494 ||  || — || February 22, 2003 || Palomar || NEAT || JLI || align=right | 5.4 km || 
|-id=495 bgcolor=#d6d6d6
| 143495 ||  || — || February 24, 2003 || Uccle || T. Pauwels || — || align=right | 7.7 km || 
|-id=496 bgcolor=#d6d6d6
| 143496 ||  || — || February 26, 2003 || Campo Imperatore || CINEOS || — || align=right | 5.4 km || 
|-id=497 bgcolor=#d6d6d6
| 143497 ||  || — || February 23, 2003 || Kitt Peak || Spacewatch || — || align=right | 7.4 km || 
|-id=498 bgcolor=#d6d6d6
| 143498 ||  || — || February 25, 2003 || Campo Imperatore || CINEOS || THM || align=right | 4.4 km || 
|-id=499 bgcolor=#d6d6d6
| 143499 ||  || — || February 26, 2003 || Campo Imperatore || CINEOS || — || align=right | 6.0 km || 
|-id=500 bgcolor=#d6d6d6
| 143500 ||  || — || February 25, 2003 || Haleakala || NEAT || EOS || align=right | 3.2 km || 
|}

143501–143600 

|-bgcolor=#d6d6d6
| 143501 ||  || — || February 26, 2003 || Haleakala || NEAT || — || align=right | 5.1 km || 
|-id=502 bgcolor=#E9E9E9
| 143502 ||  || — || February 25, 2003 || Haleakala || NEAT || — || align=right | 2.7 km || 
|-id=503 bgcolor=#E9E9E9
| 143503 ||  || — || February 26, 2003 || Socorro || LINEAR || — || align=right | 4.6 km || 
|-id=504 bgcolor=#d6d6d6
| 143504 ||  || — || February 22, 2003 || Goodricke-Pigott || J. W. Kessel || HYG || align=right | 5.5 km || 
|-id=505 bgcolor=#E9E9E9
| 143505 ||  || — || February 22, 2003 || Goodricke-Pigott || J. W. Kessel || — || align=right | 3.7 km || 
|-id=506 bgcolor=#d6d6d6
| 143506 ||  || — || February 22, 2003 || Goodricke-Pigott || J. W. Kessel || VER || align=right | 6.0 km || 
|-id=507 bgcolor=#E9E9E9
| 143507 ||  || — || February 22, 2003 || Palomar || NEAT || — || align=right | 3.9 km || 
|-id=508 bgcolor=#d6d6d6
| 143508 ||  || — || February 24, 2003 || Needville || J. Dellinger, W. G. Dillon || — || align=right | 3.8 km || 
|-id=509 bgcolor=#d6d6d6
| 143509 ||  || — || March 5, 2003 || Socorro || LINEAR || EOS || align=right | 5.8 km || 
|-id=510 bgcolor=#E9E9E9
| 143510 ||  || — || March 6, 2003 || Desert Eagle || W. K. Y. Yeung || — || align=right | 2.8 km || 
|-id=511 bgcolor=#d6d6d6
| 143511 ||  || — || March 6, 2003 || Anderson Mesa || LONEOS || — || align=right | 5.6 km || 
|-id=512 bgcolor=#d6d6d6
| 143512 ||  || — || March 6, 2003 || Anderson Mesa || LONEOS || — || align=right | 7.1 km || 
|-id=513 bgcolor=#d6d6d6
| 143513 ||  || — || March 6, 2003 || Anderson Mesa || LONEOS || — || align=right | 5.8 km || 
|-id=514 bgcolor=#d6d6d6
| 143514 ||  || — || March 6, 2003 || Anderson Mesa || LONEOS || — || align=right | 8.9 km || 
|-id=515 bgcolor=#d6d6d6
| 143515 ||  || — || March 6, 2003 || Socorro || LINEAR || — || align=right | 6.4 km || 
|-id=516 bgcolor=#d6d6d6
| 143516 ||  || — || March 6, 2003 || Anderson Mesa || LONEOS || 637 || align=right | 5.5 km || 
|-id=517 bgcolor=#E9E9E9
| 143517 ||  || — || March 6, 2003 || Anderson Mesa || LONEOS || — || align=right | 2.0 km || 
|-id=518 bgcolor=#d6d6d6
| 143518 ||  || — || March 6, 2003 || Anderson Mesa || LONEOS || — || align=right | 4.9 km || 
|-id=519 bgcolor=#d6d6d6
| 143519 ||  || — || March 6, 2003 || Socorro || LINEAR || — || align=right | 5.9 km || 
|-id=520 bgcolor=#E9E9E9
| 143520 ||  || — || March 6, 2003 || Socorro || LINEAR || — || align=right | 4.2 km || 
|-id=521 bgcolor=#E9E9E9
| 143521 ||  || — || March 6, 2003 || Socorro || LINEAR || — || align=right | 4.8 km || 
|-id=522 bgcolor=#d6d6d6
| 143522 ||  || — || March 6, 2003 || Palomar || NEAT || HYG || align=right | 5.5 km || 
|-id=523 bgcolor=#d6d6d6
| 143523 ||  || — || March 6, 2003 || Palomar || NEAT || — || align=right | 4.5 km || 
|-id=524 bgcolor=#d6d6d6
| 143524 ||  || — || March 6, 2003 || Palomar || NEAT || — || align=right | 5.2 km || 
|-id=525 bgcolor=#d6d6d6
| 143525 ||  || — || March 7, 2003 || Socorro || LINEAR || — || align=right | 5.2 km || 
|-id=526 bgcolor=#d6d6d6
| 143526 ||  || — || March 7, 2003 || Socorro || LINEAR || — || align=right | 4.5 km || 
|-id=527 bgcolor=#FFC2E0
| 143527 ||  || — || March 8, 2003 || Kitt Peak || Spacewatch || AMO || align=right data-sort-value="0.66" | 660 m || 
|-id=528 bgcolor=#d6d6d6
| 143528 ||  || — || March 6, 2003 || Anderson Mesa || LONEOS || — || align=right | 5.0 km || 
|-id=529 bgcolor=#d6d6d6
| 143529 ||  || — || March 6, 2003 || Anderson Mesa || LONEOS || VER || align=right | 5.3 km || 
|-id=530 bgcolor=#d6d6d6
| 143530 ||  || — || March 6, 2003 || Anderson Mesa || LONEOS || EOS || align=right | 3.1 km || 
|-id=531 bgcolor=#d6d6d6
| 143531 ||  || — || March 6, 2003 || Anderson Mesa || LONEOS || — || align=right | 4.1 km || 
|-id=532 bgcolor=#d6d6d6
| 143532 ||  || — || March 6, 2003 || Anderson Mesa || LONEOS || — || align=right | 5.1 km || 
|-id=533 bgcolor=#E9E9E9
| 143533 ||  || — || March 6, 2003 || Anderson Mesa || LONEOS || — || align=right | 2.6 km || 
|-id=534 bgcolor=#d6d6d6
| 143534 ||  || — || March 6, 2003 || Anderson Mesa || LONEOS || — || align=right | 6.2 km || 
|-id=535 bgcolor=#d6d6d6
| 143535 ||  || — || March 6, 2003 || Socorro || LINEAR || THM || align=right | 5.6 km || 
|-id=536 bgcolor=#d6d6d6
| 143536 ||  || — || March 6, 2003 || Socorro || LINEAR || THM || align=right | 4.2 km || 
|-id=537 bgcolor=#E9E9E9
| 143537 ||  || — || March 6, 2003 || Socorro || LINEAR || — || align=right | 4.0 km || 
|-id=538 bgcolor=#d6d6d6
| 143538 ||  || — || March 6, 2003 || Anderson Mesa || LONEOS || EOS || align=right | 3.8 km || 
|-id=539 bgcolor=#d6d6d6
| 143539 ||  || — || March 6, 2003 || Anderson Mesa || LONEOS || EOS || align=right | 3.3 km || 
|-id=540 bgcolor=#d6d6d6
| 143540 ||  || — || March 6, 2003 || Anderson Mesa || LONEOS || — || align=right | 4.6 km || 
|-id=541 bgcolor=#d6d6d6
| 143541 ||  || — || March 6, 2003 || Socorro || LINEAR || ALA || align=right | 8.7 km || 
|-id=542 bgcolor=#d6d6d6
| 143542 ||  || — || March 6, 2003 || Palomar || NEAT || THM || align=right | 4.1 km || 
|-id=543 bgcolor=#d6d6d6
| 143543 ||  || — || March 6, 2003 || Palomar || NEAT || — || align=right | 4.3 km || 
|-id=544 bgcolor=#d6d6d6
| 143544 ||  || — || March 6, 2003 || Palomar || NEAT || EOS || align=right | 3.2 km || 
|-id=545 bgcolor=#d6d6d6
| 143545 ||  || — || March 6, 2003 || Palomar || NEAT || — || align=right | 5.2 km || 
|-id=546 bgcolor=#d6d6d6
| 143546 ||  || — || March 6, 2003 || Palomar || NEAT || — || align=right | 4.3 km || 
|-id=547 bgcolor=#d6d6d6
| 143547 ||  || — || March 7, 2003 || Socorro || LINEAR || — || align=right | 6.0 km || 
|-id=548 bgcolor=#E9E9E9
| 143548 ||  || — || March 7, 2003 || Socorro || LINEAR || — || align=right | 2.4 km || 
|-id=549 bgcolor=#E9E9E9
| 143549 ||  || — || March 8, 2003 || Anderson Mesa || LONEOS || — || align=right | 4.3 km || 
|-id=550 bgcolor=#E9E9E9
| 143550 ||  || — || March 8, 2003 || Anderson Mesa || LONEOS || — || align=right | 4.6 km || 
|-id=551 bgcolor=#d6d6d6
| 143551 ||  || — || March 8, 2003 || Anderson Mesa || LONEOS || TIR || align=right | 3.4 km || 
|-id=552 bgcolor=#d6d6d6
| 143552 ||  || — || March 8, 2003 || Anderson Mesa || LONEOS || — || align=right | 4.7 km || 
|-id=553 bgcolor=#d6d6d6
| 143553 ||  || — || March 8, 2003 || Anderson Mesa || LONEOS || — || align=right | 10 km || 
|-id=554 bgcolor=#E9E9E9
| 143554 ||  || — || March 8, 2003 || Socorro || LINEAR || — || align=right | 2.2 km || 
|-id=555 bgcolor=#E9E9E9
| 143555 ||  || — || March 8, 2003 || Socorro || LINEAR || ADE || align=right | 3.9 km || 
|-id=556 bgcolor=#d6d6d6
| 143556 ||  || — || March 8, 2003 || Kitt Peak || Spacewatch || HYG || align=right | 3.8 km || 
|-id=557 bgcolor=#d6d6d6
| 143557 ||  || — || March 8, 2003 || Anderson Mesa || LONEOS || TIR || align=right | 5.9 km || 
|-id=558 bgcolor=#d6d6d6
| 143558 ||  || — || March 9, 2003 || Kitt Peak || Spacewatch || — || align=right | 8.5 km || 
|-id=559 bgcolor=#fefefe
| 143559 ||  || — || March 6, 2003 || Socorro || LINEAR || — || align=right | 1.2 km || 
|-id=560 bgcolor=#d6d6d6
| 143560 ||  || — || March 7, 2003 || Anderson Mesa || LONEOS || EMA || align=right | 5.4 km || 
|-id=561 bgcolor=#E9E9E9
| 143561 ||  || — || March 7, 2003 || Socorro || LINEAR || AEO || align=right | 1.7 km || 
|-id=562 bgcolor=#E9E9E9
| 143562 ||  || — || March 7, 2003 || Socorro || LINEAR || — || align=right | 3.5 km || 
|-id=563 bgcolor=#E9E9E9
| 143563 ||  || — || March 8, 2003 || Anderson Mesa || LONEOS || — || align=right | 3.8 km || 
|-id=564 bgcolor=#d6d6d6
| 143564 ||  || — || March 9, 2003 || Anderson Mesa || LONEOS || — || align=right | 5.5 km || 
|-id=565 bgcolor=#d6d6d6
| 143565 ||  || — || March 9, 2003 || Socorro || LINEAR || — || align=right | 3.9 km || 
|-id=566 bgcolor=#d6d6d6
| 143566 ||  || — || March 9, 2003 || Socorro || LINEAR || THM || align=right | 5.4 km || 
|-id=567 bgcolor=#d6d6d6
| 143567 ||  || — || March 10, 2003 || Anderson Mesa || LONEOS || — || align=right | 6.0 km || 
|-id=568 bgcolor=#d6d6d6
| 143568 ||  || — || March 8, 2003 || Socorro || LINEAR || EOS || align=right | 4.0 km || 
|-id=569 bgcolor=#E9E9E9
| 143569 ||  || — || March 8, 2003 || Anderson Mesa || LONEOS || JUN || align=right | 2.6 km || 
|-id=570 bgcolor=#E9E9E9
| 143570 ||  || — || March 9, 2003 || Socorro || LINEAR || — || align=right | 5.5 km || 
|-id=571 bgcolor=#E9E9E9
| 143571 ||  || — || March 9, 2003 || Socorro || LINEAR || INO || align=right | 2.4 km || 
|-id=572 bgcolor=#d6d6d6
| 143572 ||  || — || March 10, 2003 || Socorro || LINEAR || — || align=right | 7.0 km || 
|-id=573 bgcolor=#d6d6d6
| 143573 ||  || — || March 11, 2003 || Palomar || NEAT || — || align=right | 6.7 km || 
|-id=574 bgcolor=#E9E9E9
| 143574 ||  || — || March 11, 2003 || Socorro || LINEAR || HNS || align=right | 2.6 km || 
|-id=575 bgcolor=#d6d6d6
| 143575 ||  || — || March 12, 2003 || Desert Moon || B. L. Stevens || — || align=right | 4.8 km || 
|-id=576 bgcolor=#E9E9E9
| 143576 ||  || — || March 24, 2003 || Socorro || LINEAR || — || align=right | 4.0 km || 
|-id=577 bgcolor=#d6d6d6
| 143577 ||  || — || March 23, 2003 || Vicques || M. Ory || — || align=right | 4.6 km || 
|-id=578 bgcolor=#d6d6d6
| 143578 ||  || — || March 24, 2003 || Črni Vrh || H. Mikuž, S. Matičič || MEL || align=right | 7.5 km || 
|-id=579 bgcolor=#E9E9E9
| 143579 Dérimiksa ||  ||  || March 28, 2003 || Piszkéstető || K. Sárneczky || NEM || align=right | 4.0 km || 
|-id=580 bgcolor=#E9E9E9
| 143580 ||  || — || March 21, 2003 || Haleakala || NEAT || JUN || align=right | 2.3 km || 
|-id=581 bgcolor=#d6d6d6
| 143581 ||  || — || March 23, 2003 || Kitt Peak || Spacewatch || — || align=right | 6.1 km || 
|-id=582 bgcolor=#d6d6d6
| 143582 ||  || — || March 23, 2003 || Kitt Peak || Spacewatch || — || align=right | 5.1 km || 
|-id=583 bgcolor=#d6d6d6
| 143583 ||  || — || March 23, 2003 || Kitt Peak || Spacewatch || — || align=right | 4.8 km || 
|-id=584 bgcolor=#d6d6d6
| 143584 ||  || — || March 23, 2003 || Kitt Peak || Spacewatch || HYG || align=right | 6.6 km || 
|-id=585 bgcolor=#d6d6d6
| 143585 ||  || — || March 23, 2003 || Kitt Peak || Spacewatch || — || align=right | 5.4 km || 
|-id=586 bgcolor=#d6d6d6
| 143586 ||  || — || March 24, 2003 || Kitt Peak || Spacewatch || THM || align=right | 4.1 km || 
|-id=587 bgcolor=#E9E9E9
| 143587 ||  || — || March 24, 2003 || Haleakala || NEAT || — || align=right | 4.3 km || 
|-id=588 bgcolor=#d6d6d6
| 143588 ||  || — || March 24, 2003 || Kitt Peak || Spacewatch || THM || align=right | 3.7 km || 
|-id=589 bgcolor=#E9E9E9
| 143589 ||  || — || March 24, 2003 || Kitt Peak || Spacewatch || — || align=right | 1.6 km || 
|-id=590 bgcolor=#d6d6d6
| 143590 ||  || — || March 25, 2003 || Palomar || NEAT || — || align=right | 5.1 km || 
|-id=591 bgcolor=#d6d6d6
| 143591 ||  || — || March 25, 2003 || Palomar || NEAT || — || align=right | 5.2 km || 
|-id=592 bgcolor=#d6d6d6
| 143592 ||  || — || March 25, 2003 || Haleakala || NEAT || — || align=right | 4.6 km || 
|-id=593 bgcolor=#d6d6d6
| 143593 ||  || — || March 26, 2003 || Palomar || NEAT || — || align=right | 5.1 km || 
|-id=594 bgcolor=#E9E9E9
| 143594 ||  || — || March 26, 2003 || Kitt Peak || Spacewatch || — || align=right | 4.2 km || 
|-id=595 bgcolor=#d6d6d6
| 143595 ||  || — || March 26, 2003 || Palomar || NEAT || EOS || align=right | 4.0 km || 
|-id=596 bgcolor=#d6d6d6
| 143596 ||  || — || March 26, 2003 || Kitt Peak || Spacewatch || — || align=right | 4.9 km || 
|-id=597 bgcolor=#E9E9E9
| 143597 ||  || — || March 26, 2003 || Kitt Peak || Spacewatch || — || align=right | 1.3 km || 
|-id=598 bgcolor=#E9E9E9
| 143598 ||  || — || March 27, 2003 || Palomar || NEAT || — || align=right | 3.4 km || 
|-id=599 bgcolor=#fefefe
| 143599 ||  || — || March 27, 2003 || Kitt Peak || Spacewatch || — || align=right | 1.3 km || 
|-id=600 bgcolor=#E9E9E9
| 143600 ||  || — || March 27, 2003 || Socorro || LINEAR || MIS || align=right | 4.6 km || 
|}

143601–143700 

|-bgcolor=#d6d6d6
| 143601 ||  || — || March 27, 2003 || Socorro || LINEAR || HYG || align=right | 4.6 km || 
|-id=602 bgcolor=#d6d6d6
| 143602 ||  || — || March 27, 2003 || Socorro || LINEAR || — || align=right | 5.0 km || 
|-id=603 bgcolor=#d6d6d6
| 143603 ||  || — || March 29, 2003 || Anderson Mesa || LONEOS || HYG || align=right | 6.3 km || 
|-id=604 bgcolor=#E9E9E9
| 143604 ||  || — || March 29, 2003 || Anderson Mesa || LONEOS || — || align=right | 2.4 km || 
|-id=605 bgcolor=#d6d6d6
| 143605 ||  || — || March 29, 2003 || Anderson Mesa || LONEOS || — || align=right | 8.2 km || 
|-id=606 bgcolor=#d6d6d6
| 143606 ||  || — || March 29, 2003 || Anderson Mesa || LONEOS || URS || align=right | 6.3 km || 
|-id=607 bgcolor=#d6d6d6
| 143607 ||  || — || March 29, 2003 || Anderson Mesa || LONEOS || ALA || align=right | 8.2 km || 
|-id=608 bgcolor=#d6d6d6
| 143608 ||  || — || March 31, 2003 || Socorro || LINEAR || — || align=right | 4.9 km || 
|-id=609 bgcolor=#d6d6d6
| 143609 ||  || — || March 31, 2003 || Socorro || LINEAR || THB || align=right | 8.0 km || 
|-id=610 bgcolor=#d6d6d6
| 143610 ||  || — || March 24, 2003 || Kitt Peak || Spacewatch || — || align=right | 3.8 km || 
|-id=611 bgcolor=#E9E9E9
| 143611 ||  || — || March 25, 2003 || Palomar || NEAT || MRX || align=right | 2.3 km || 
|-id=612 bgcolor=#fefefe
| 143612 ||  || — || March 24, 2003 || Kitt Peak || Spacewatch || NYS || align=right | 1.4 km || 
|-id=613 bgcolor=#d6d6d6
| 143613 ||  || — || March 25, 2003 || Anderson Mesa || LONEOS || — || align=right | 4.7 km || 
|-id=614 bgcolor=#d6d6d6
| 143614 ||  || — || April 1, 2003 || Socorro || LINEAR || HYG || align=right | 4.3 km || 
|-id=615 bgcolor=#fefefe
| 143615 ||  || — || April 1, 2003 || Socorro || LINEAR || — || align=right | 1.3 km || 
|-id=616 bgcolor=#d6d6d6
| 143616 ||  || — || April 1, 2003 || Socorro || LINEAR || — || align=right | 5.2 km || 
|-id=617 bgcolor=#d6d6d6
| 143617 ||  || — || April 1, 2003 || Socorro || LINEAR || — || align=right | 5.4 km || 
|-id=618 bgcolor=#d6d6d6
| 143618 ||  || — || April 7, 2003 || Uccle || T. Pauwels || — || align=right | 4.5 km || 
|-id=619 bgcolor=#E9E9E9
| 143619 ||  || — || April 9, 2003 || Kitt Peak || Spacewatch || — || align=right | 4.5 km || 
|-id=620 bgcolor=#d6d6d6
| 143620 ||  || — || April 4, 2003 || Haleakala || NEAT || URS || align=right | 7.6 km || 
|-id=621 bgcolor=#d6d6d6
| 143621 ||  || — || April 4, 2003 || Kitt Peak || Spacewatch || SHU3:2 || align=right | 8.3 km || 
|-id=622 bgcolor=#fefefe
| 143622 Robertbloch || 2003 HG ||  || April 22, 2003 || Vicques || M. Ory || V || align=right data-sort-value="0.96" | 960 m || 
|-id=623 bgcolor=#E9E9E9
| 143623 ||  || — || April 24, 2003 || Anderson Mesa || LONEOS || — || align=right | 3.9 km || 
|-id=624 bgcolor=#FFC2E0
| 143624 ||  || — || April 27, 2003 || Socorro || LINEAR || APO +1kmPHA || align=right | 2.1 km || 
|-id=625 bgcolor=#d6d6d6
| 143625 ||  || — || April 25, 2003 || Anderson Mesa || LONEOS || — || align=right | 8.4 km || 
|-id=626 bgcolor=#d6d6d6
| 143626 ||  || — || April 25, 2003 || Campo Imperatore || CINEOS || — || align=right | 4.5 km || 
|-id=627 bgcolor=#d6d6d6
| 143627 ||  || — || April 26, 2003 || Haleakala || NEAT || — || align=right | 5.8 km || 
|-id=628 bgcolor=#fefefe
| 143628 ||  || — || April 26, 2003 || Kitt Peak || Spacewatch || MAS || align=right data-sort-value="0.95" | 950 m || 
|-id=629 bgcolor=#d6d6d6
| 143629 ||  || — || April 29, 2003 || Socorro || LINEAR || — || align=right | 6.8 km || 
|-id=630 bgcolor=#fefefe
| 143630 ||  || — || April 29, 2003 || Anderson Mesa || LONEOS || — || align=right | 1.1 km || 
|-id=631 bgcolor=#d6d6d6
| 143631 ||  || — || April 27, 2003 || Socorro || LINEAR || 7:4 || align=right | 6.9 km || 
|-id=632 bgcolor=#d6d6d6
| 143632 ||  || — || April 26, 2003 || Haleakala || NEAT || IMH || align=right | 5.2 km || 
|-id=633 bgcolor=#d6d6d6
| 143633 ||  || — || April 22, 2003 || Bergisch Gladbach || W. Bickel || THM || align=right | 3.3 km || 
|-id=634 bgcolor=#d6d6d6
| 143634 ||  || — || April 24, 2003 || Haleakala || NEAT || — || align=right | 7.0 km || 
|-id=635 bgcolor=#d6d6d6
| 143635 ||  || — || April 24, 2003 || Haleakala || NEAT || — || align=right | 7.5 km || 
|-id=636 bgcolor=#d6d6d6
| 143636 ||  || — || May 30, 2003 || Anderson Mesa || LONEOS || — || align=right | 8.5 km || 
|-id=637 bgcolor=#FFC2E0
| 143637 ||  || — || June 12, 2003 || Socorro || LINEAR || APO +1km || align=right | 1.9 km || 
|-id=638 bgcolor=#d6d6d6
| 143638 ||  || — || June 28, 2003 || Socorro || LINEAR || — || align=right | 3.8 km || 
|-id=639 bgcolor=#fefefe
| 143639 ||  || — || June 30, 2003 || Socorro || LINEAR || H || align=right | 1.4 km || 
|-id=640 bgcolor=#fefefe
| 143640 ||  || — || July 5, 2003 || Socorro || LINEAR || H || align=right | 1.2 km || 
|-id=641 bgcolor=#fefefe
| 143641 Sapello ||  ||  || July 5, 2003 || Mount Graham || W. H. Ryan, C. T. Martinez || — || align=right | 1.0 km || 
|-id=642 bgcolor=#fefefe
| 143642 ||  || — || July 7, 2003 || Reedy Creek || J. Broughton || NYS || align=right | 3.1 km || 
|-id=643 bgcolor=#FFC2E0
| 143643 ||  || — || July 7, 2003 || Palomar || NEAT || AMO || align=right data-sort-value="0.76" | 760 m || 
|-id=644 bgcolor=#fefefe
| 143644 ||  || — || July 23, 2003 || Wise || D. Polishook || NYS || align=right | 1.2 km || 
|-id=645 bgcolor=#d6d6d6
| 143645 ||  || — || July 22, 2003 || Haleakala || NEAT || EUP || align=right | 8.8 km || 
|-id=646 bgcolor=#fefefe
| 143646 ||  || — || July 25, 2003 || Palomar || NEAT || V || align=right | 1.1 km || 
|-id=647 bgcolor=#fefefe
| 143647 ||  || — || July 27, 2003 || Haleakala || NEAT || H || align=right | 1.1 km || 
|-id=648 bgcolor=#d6d6d6
| 143648 ||  || — || August 22, 2003 || Palomar || NEAT || — || align=right | 7.3 km || 
|-id=649 bgcolor=#FFC2E0
| 143649 ||  || — || August 24, 2003 || Socorro || LINEAR || APO +1kmPHAmoon || align=right | 1.2 km || 
|-id=650 bgcolor=#E9E9E9
| 143650 ||  || — || August 23, 2003 || Socorro || LINEAR || — || align=right | 2.6 km || 
|-id=651 bgcolor=#FFC2E0
| 143651 ||  || — || August 31, 2003 || Haleakala || NEAT || APO +1kmPHAslow || align=right | 2.3 km || 
|-id=652 bgcolor=#E9E9E9
| 143652 ||  || — || September 14, 2003 || Haleakala || NEAT || — || align=right | 1.5 km || 
|-id=653 bgcolor=#fefefe
| 143653 ||  || — || September 15, 2003 || Haleakala || NEAT || H || align=right data-sort-value="0.89" | 890 m || 
|-id=654 bgcolor=#fefefe
| 143654 ||  || — || September 17, 2003 || Socorro || LINEAR || PHO || align=right | 1.8 km || 
|-id=655 bgcolor=#fefefe
| 143655 ||  || — || September 16, 2003 || Kitt Peak || Spacewatch || H || align=right data-sort-value="0.87" | 870 m || 
|-id=656 bgcolor=#E9E9E9
| 143656 ||  || — || September 16, 2003 || Palomar || NEAT || — || align=right | 3.2 km || 
|-id=657 bgcolor=#fefefe
| 143657 ||  || — || September 16, 2003 || Anderson Mesa || LONEOS || — || align=right | 1.1 km || 
|-id=658 bgcolor=#d6d6d6
| 143658 ||  || — || September 16, 2003 || Anderson Mesa || LONEOS || 3:2 || align=right | 5.9 km || 
|-id=659 bgcolor=#fefefe
| 143659 ||  || — || September 16, 2003 || Anderson Mesa || LONEOS || — || align=right data-sort-value="0.96" | 960 m || 
|-id=660 bgcolor=#fefefe
| 143660 ||  || — || September 17, 2003 || Kitt Peak || Spacewatch || — || align=right data-sort-value="0.86" | 860 m || 
|-id=661 bgcolor=#fefefe
| 143661 ||  || — || September 18, 2003 || Kitt Peak || Spacewatch || — || align=right data-sort-value="0.83" | 830 m || 
|-id=662 bgcolor=#fefefe
| 143662 ||  || — || September 20, 2003 || Socorro || LINEAR || H || align=right data-sort-value="0.98" | 980 m || 
|-id=663 bgcolor=#fefefe
| 143663 ||  || — || September 18, 2003 || Anderson Mesa || LONEOS || H || align=right data-sort-value="0.95" | 950 m || 
|-id=664 bgcolor=#d6d6d6
| 143664 ||  || — || September 18, 2003 || Kitt Peak || Spacewatch || — || align=right | 4.5 km || 
|-id=665 bgcolor=#fefefe
| 143665 ||  || — || September 19, 2003 || Kitt Peak || Spacewatch || V || align=right | 1.4 km || 
|-id=666 bgcolor=#fefefe
| 143666 ||  || — || September 20, 2003 || Kitt Peak || Spacewatch || — || align=right | 1.5 km || 
|-id=667 bgcolor=#E9E9E9
| 143667 ||  || — || September 19, 2003 || Socorro || LINEAR || — || align=right | 4.0 km || 
|-id=668 bgcolor=#fefefe
| 143668 ||  || — || September 20, 2003 || Socorro || LINEAR || — || align=right | 1.2 km || 
|-id=669 bgcolor=#fefefe
| 143669 ||  || — || September 19, 2003 || Palomar || NEAT || H || align=right | 1.1 km || 
|-id=670 bgcolor=#fefefe
| 143670 ||  || — || September 20, 2003 || Campo Imperatore || CINEOS || — || align=right | 1.4 km || 
|-id=671 bgcolor=#d6d6d6
| 143671 ||  || — || September 18, 2003 || Palomar || NEAT || — || align=right | 6.2 km || 
|-id=672 bgcolor=#fefefe
| 143672 ||  || — || September 19, 2003 || Anderson Mesa || LONEOS || — || align=right | 1.2 km || 
|-id=673 bgcolor=#fefefe
| 143673 ||  || — || September 20, 2003 || Palomar || NEAT || — || align=right | 2.6 km || 
|-id=674 bgcolor=#fefefe
| 143674 ||  || — || September 25, 2003 || Haleakala || NEAT || — || align=right | 1.4 km || 
|-id=675 bgcolor=#d6d6d6
| 143675 ||  || — || September 26, 2003 || Desert Eagle || W. K. Y. Yeung || KOR || align=right | 2.1 km || 
|-id=676 bgcolor=#fefefe
| 143676 ||  || — || September 26, 2003 || Desert Eagle || W. K. Y. Yeung || — || align=right | 1.1 km || 
|-id=677 bgcolor=#fefefe
| 143677 ||  || — || September 29, 2003 || Desert Eagle || W. K. Y. Yeung || — || align=right | 1.4 km || 
|-id=678 bgcolor=#FFC2E0
| 143678 ||  || — || September 30, 2003 || Socorro || LINEAR || AMO +1km || align=right | 2.0 km || 
|-id=679 bgcolor=#d6d6d6
| 143679 ||  || — || September 26, 2003 || Socorro || LINEAR || KOR || align=right | 2.1 km || 
|-id=680 bgcolor=#fefefe
| 143680 ||  || — || September 27, 2003 || Kitt Peak || Spacewatch || EUT || align=right | 1.2 km || 
|-id=681 bgcolor=#fefefe
| 143681 ||  || — || September 27, 2003 || Kitt Peak || Spacewatch || — || align=right | 1.1 km || 
|-id=682 bgcolor=#fefefe
| 143682 ||  || — || September 29, 2003 || Socorro || LINEAR || MAS || align=right | 1.2 km || 
|-id=683 bgcolor=#fefefe
| 143683 ||  || — || September 18, 2003 || Palomar || NEAT || — || align=right | 1.4 km || 
|-id=684 bgcolor=#fefefe
| 143684 ||  || — || September 27, 2003 || Socorro || LINEAR || FLO || align=right data-sort-value="0.84" | 840 m || 
|-id=685 bgcolor=#C2E0FF
| 143685 ||  || — || September 25, 2003 || Mauna Kea || Mauna Kea Obs. || res3:4critical || align=right | 122 km || 
|-id=686 bgcolor=#fefefe
| 143686 ||  || — || October 14, 2003 || Anderson Mesa || LONEOS || V || align=right | 1.1 km || 
|-id=687 bgcolor=#fefefe
| 143687 ||  || — || October 15, 2003 || Anderson Mesa || LONEOS || — || align=right | 1.4 km || 
|-id=688 bgcolor=#fefefe
| 143688 ||  || — || October 1, 2003 || Kitt Peak || Spacewatch || — || align=right data-sort-value="0.75" | 750 m || 
|-id=689 bgcolor=#fefefe
| 143689 ||  || — || October 19, 2003 || Kitt Peak || Spacewatch || FLO || align=right | 1.1 km || 
|-id=690 bgcolor=#fefefe
| 143690 ||  || — || October 16, 2003 || Kitt Peak || Spacewatch || — || align=right data-sort-value="0.87" | 870 m || 
|-id=691 bgcolor=#fefefe
| 143691 ||  || — || October 16, 2003 || Anderson Mesa || LONEOS || FLO || align=right | 1.1 km || 
|-id=692 bgcolor=#fefefe
| 143692 ||  || — || October 21, 2003 || Socorro || LINEAR || — || align=right | 1.5 km || 
|-id=693 bgcolor=#fefefe
| 143693 ||  || — || October 19, 2003 || Anderson Mesa || LONEOS || V || align=right data-sort-value="0.94" | 940 m || 
|-id=694 bgcolor=#fefefe
| 143694 ||  || — || October 22, 2003 || Kitt Peak || Spacewatch || — || align=right | 1.1 km || 
|-id=695 bgcolor=#fefefe
| 143695 ||  || — || October 16, 2003 || Anderson Mesa || LONEOS || — || align=right | 1.3 km || 
|-id=696 bgcolor=#fefefe
| 143696 ||  || — || October 16, 2003 || Anderson Mesa || LONEOS || — || align=right | 1.2 km || 
|-id=697 bgcolor=#fefefe
| 143697 ||  || — || October 18, 2003 || Kitt Peak || Spacewatch || — || align=right data-sort-value="0.85" | 850 m || 
|-id=698 bgcolor=#fefefe
| 143698 ||  || — || October 18, 2003 || Palomar || NEAT || FLO || align=right | 1.4 km || 
|-id=699 bgcolor=#fefefe
| 143699 ||  || — || October 18, 2003 || Palomar || NEAT || — || align=right | 1.4 km || 
|-id=700 bgcolor=#fefefe
| 143700 ||  || — || October 26, 2003 || Kvistaberg || UDAS || — || align=right | 1.1 km || 
|}

143701–143800 

|-bgcolor=#d6d6d6
| 143701 ||  || — || October 19, 2003 || Haleakala || NEAT || — || align=right | 4.8 km || 
|-id=702 bgcolor=#fefefe
| 143702 ||  || — || October 20, 2003 || Socorro || LINEAR || — || align=right data-sort-value="0.97" | 970 m || 
|-id=703 bgcolor=#fefefe
| 143703 ||  || — || October 20, 2003 || Socorro || LINEAR || FLO || align=right | 1.1 km || 
|-id=704 bgcolor=#fefefe
| 143704 ||  || — || October 19, 2003 || Palomar || NEAT || — || align=right | 1.2 km || 
|-id=705 bgcolor=#fefefe
| 143705 ||  || — || October 20, 2003 || Palomar || NEAT || V || align=right | 1.8 km || 
|-id=706 bgcolor=#fefefe
| 143706 ||  || — || October 21, 2003 || Socorro || LINEAR || — || align=right | 1.3 km || 
|-id=707 bgcolor=#C2E0FF
| 143707 ||  || — || October 22, 2003 || Kitt Peak || Spacewatch || res2:5 || align=right | 278 km || 
|-id=708 bgcolor=#d6d6d6
| 143708 ||  || — || October 20, 2003 || Palomar || NEAT || — || align=right | 6.1 km || 
|-id=709 bgcolor=#fefefe
| 143709 ||  || — || October 19, 2003 || Palomar || NEAT || — || align=right | 1.2 km || 
|-id=710 bgcolor=#fefefe
| 143710 ||  || — || October 20, 2003 || Palomar || NEAT || — || align=right | 1.2 km || 
|-id=711 bgcolor=#d6d6d6
| 143711 ||  || — || October 21, 2003 || Socorro || LINEAR || KAR || align=right | 2.0 km || 
|-id=712 bgcolor=#d6d6d6
| 143712 ||  || — || October 18, 2003 || Anderson Mesa || LONEOS || — || align=right | 3.6 km || 
|-id=713 bgcolor=#fefefe
| 143713 ||  || — || October 18, 2003 || Anderson Mesa || LONEOS || — || align=right | 1.6 km || 
|-id=714 bgcolor=#fefefe
| 143714 ||  || — || October 20, 2003 || Kitt Peak || Spacewatch || — || align=right | 1.2 km || 
|-id=715 bgcolor=#fefefe
| 143715 ||  || — || October 20, 2003 || Kitt Peak || Spacewatch || — || align=right | 1.2 km || 
|-id=716 bgcolor=#fefefe
| 143716 ||  || — || October 21, 2003 || Socorro || LINEAR || — || align=right | 1.4 km || 
|-id=717 bgcolor=#fefefe
| 143717 ||  || — || October 21, 2003 || Palomar || NEAT || — || align=right | 1.1 km || 
|-id=718 bgcolor=#fefefe
| 143718 ||  || — || October 22, 2003 || Socorro || LINEAR || — || align=right | 1.3 km || 
|-id=719 bgcolor=#E9E9E9
| 143719 ||  || — || October 21, 2003 || Palomar || NEAT || slow || align=right | 3.4 km || 
|-id=720 bgcolor=#fefefe
| 143720 ||  || — || October 21, 2003 || Palomar || NEAT || MAS || align=right | 1.2 km || 
|-id=721 bgcolor=#fefefe
| 143721 ||  || — || October 21, 2003 || Palomar || NEAT || — || align=right | 1.2 km || 
|-id=722 bgcolor=#fefefe
| 143722 ||  || — || October 22, 2003 || Socorro || LINEAR || FLO || align=right | 1.1 km || 
|-id=723 bgcolor=#d6d6d6
| 143723 ||  || — || October 21, 2003 || Socorro || LINEAR || — || align=right | 4.9 km || 
|-id=724 bgcolor=#d6d6d6
| 143724 ||  || — || October 21, 2003 || Socorro || LINEAR || KOR || align=right | 2.4 km || 
|-id=725 bgcolor=#fefefe
| 143725 ||  || — || October 21, 2003 || Socorro || LINEAR || NYS || align=right | 1.3 km || 
|-id=726 bgcolor=#fefefe
| 143726 ||  || — || October 21, 2003 || Socorro || LINEAR || — || align=right | 2.9 km || 
|-id=727 bgcolor=#fefefe
| 143727 ||  || — || October 21, 2003 || Kitt Peak || Spacewatch || — || align=right | 1.4 km || 
|-id=728 bgcolor=#fefefe
| 143728 ||  || — || October 22, 2003 || Socorro || LINEAR || — || align=right | 1.5 km || 
|-id=729 bgcolor=#fefefe
| 143729 ||  || — || October 23, 2003 || Anderson Mesa || LONEOS || V || align=right | 1.1 km || 
|-id=730 bgcolor=#fefefe
| 143730 ||  || — || October 23, 2003 || Kitt Peak || Spacewatch || FLO || align=right | 1.3 km || 
|-id=731 bgcolor=#fefefe
| 143731 ||  || — || October 23, 2003 || Haleakala || NEAT || V || align=right | 1.0 km || 
|-id=732 bgcolor=#fefefe
| 143732 ||  || — || October 21, 2003 || Socorro || LINEAR || — || align=right | 1.0 km || 
|-id=733 bgcolor=#fefefe
| 143733 ||  || — || October 21, 2003 || Socorro || LINEAR || — || align=right | 1.9 km || 
|-id=734 bgcolor=#fefefe
| 143734 ||  || — || October 22, 2003 || Socorro || LINEAR || — || align=right | 1.4 km || 
|-id=735 bgcolor=#fefefe
| 143735 ||  || — || October 22, 2003 || Socorro || LINEAR || FLO || align=right | 1.2 km || 
|-id=736 bgcolor=#fefefe
| 143736 ||  || — || October 22, 2003 || Kitt Peak || Spacewatch || — || align=right | 1.3 km || 
|-id=737 bgcolor=#fefefe
| 143737 ||  || — || October 22, 2003 || Haleakala || NEAT || H || align=right | 1.5 km || 
|-id=738 bgcolor=#E9E9E9
| 143738 ||  || — || October 24, 2003 || Socorro || LINEAR || MRX || align=right | 1.6 km || 
|-id=739 bgcolor=#fefefe
| 143739 ||  || — || October 24, 2003 || Socorro || LINEAR || FLO || align=right | 1.1 km || 
|-id=740 bgcolor=#fefefe
| 143740 ||  || — || October 24, 2003 || Socorro || LINEAR || — || align=right | 1.1 km || 
|-id=741 bgcolor=#fefefe
| 143741 ||  || — || October 25, 2003 || Socorro || LINEAR || FLO || align=right data-sort-value="0.94" | 940 m || 
|-id=742 bgcolor=#fefefe
| 143742 ||  || — || October 25, 2003 || Socorro || LINEAR || V || align=right data-sort-value="0.85" | 850 m || 
|-id=743 bgcolor=#fefefe
| 143743 ||  || — || October 27, 2003 || Socorro || LINEAR || — || align=right | 1.2 km || 
|-id=744 bgcolor=#fefefe
| 143744 ||  || — || October 25, 2003 || Socorro || LINEAR || — || align=right | 1.6 km || 
|-id=745 bgcolor=#fefefe
| 143745 ||  || — || October 25, 2003 || Socorro || LINEAR || — || align=right | 1.3 km || 
|-id=746 bgcolor=#fefefe
| 143746 ||  || — || October 25, 2003 || Socorro || LINEAR || V || align=right | 1.1 km || 
|-id=747 bgcolor=#fefefe
| 143747 ||  || — || October 25, 2003 || Socorro || LINEAR || V || align=right | 1.2 km || 
|-id=748 bgcolor=#fefefe
| 143748 ||  || — || October 26, 2003 || Kitt Peak || Spacewatch || — || align=right | 1.7 km || 
|-id=749 bgcolor=#fefefe
| 143749 ||  || — || October 28, 2003 || Socorro || LINEAR || — || align=right data-sort-value="0.98" | 980 m || 
|-id=750 bgcolor=#d6d6d6
| 143750 ||  || — || October 23, 2003 || Kitt Peak || M. W. Buie || — || align=right | 3.7 km || 
|-id=751 bgcolor=#C2E0FF
| 143751 ||  || — || October 24, 2003 || Kitt Peak || M. W. Buie || res3:5 || align=right | 81 km || 
|-id=752 bgcolor=#fefefe
| 143752 ||  || — || November 5, 2003 || Socorro || LINEAR || — || align=right | 2.1 km || 
|-id=753 bgcolor=#fefefe
| 143753 ||  || — || November 15, 2003 || Palomar || NEAT || — || align=right | 1.8 km || 
|-id=754 bgcolor=#fefefe
| 143754 ||  || — || November 15, 2003 || Palomar || NEAT || — || align=right | 1.5 km || 
|-id=755 bgcolor=#fefefe
| 143755 ||  || — || November 15, 2003 || Palomar || NEAT || — || align=right | 1.3 km || 
|-id=756 bgcolor=#fefefe
| 143756 ||  || — || November 16, 2003 || Catalina || CSS || NYS || align=right | 1.1 km || 
|-id=757 bgcolor=#fefefe
| 143757 ||  || — || November 18, 2003 || Palomar || NEAT || FLO || align=right | 1.2 km || 
|-id=758 bgcolor=#fefefe
| 143758 ||  || — || November 18, 2003 || Palomar || NEAT || FLO || align=right data-sort-value="0.98" | 980 m || 
|-id=759 bgcolor=#fefefe
| 143759 ||  || — || November 18, 2003 || Palomar || NEAT || FLO || align=right | 1.1 km || 
|-id=760 bgcolor=#fefefe
| 143760 ||  || — || November 18, 2003 || Palomar || NEAT || FLO || align=right | 1.0 km || 
|-id=761 bgcolor=#fefefe
| 143761 ||  || — || November 16, 2003 || Catalina || CSS || — || align=right | 1.7 km || 
|-id=762 bgcolor=#fefefe
| 143762 ||  || — || November 18, 2003 || Kitt Peak || Spacewatch || — || align=right | 1.5 km || 
|-id=763 bgcolor=#fefefe
| 143763 ||  || — || November 18, 2003 || Kitt Peak || Spacewatch || V || align=right | 1.2 km || 
|-id=764 bgcolor=#fefefe
| 143764 ||  || — || November 18, 2003 || Kitt Peak || Spacewatch || V || align=right | 1.2 km || 
|-id=765 bgcolor=#fefefe
| 143765 ||  || — || November 18, 2003 || Palomar || NEAT || FLO || align=right | 1.2 km || 
|-id=766 bgcolor=#fefefe
| 143766 ||  || — || November 19, 2003 || Kitt Peak || Spacewatch || — || align=right | 3.6 km || 
|-id=767 bgcolor=#fefefe
| 143767 ||  || — || November 19, 2003 || Catalina || CSS || — || align=right data-sort-value="0.99" | 990 m || 
|-id=768 bgcolor=#fefefe
| 143768 ||  || — || November 19, 2003 || Kitt Peak || Spacewatch || — || align=right | 1.3 km || 
|-id=769 bgcolor=#fefefe
| 143769 ||  || — || November 19, 2003 || Socorro || LINEAR || V || align=right | 1.2 km || 
|-id=770 bgcolor=#fefefe
| 143770 ||  || — || November 19, 2003 || Socorro || LINEAR || — || align=right | 1.3 km || 
|-id=771 bgcolor=#fefefe
| 143771 ||  || — || November 19, 2003 || Kitt Peak || Spacewatch || — || align=right | 1.2 km || 
|-id=772 bgcolor=#fefefe
| 143772 ||  || — || November 19, 2003 || Kitt Peak || Spacewatch || FLO || align=right data-sort-value="0.83" | 830 m || 
|-id=773 bgcolor=#fefefe
| 143773 ||  || — || November 16, 2003 || Catalina || CSS || FLO || align=right data-sort-value="0.97" | 970 m || 
|-id=774 bgcolor=#fefefe
| 143774 ||  || — || November 18, 2003 || Catalina || CSS || — || align=right | 1.4 km || 
|-id=775 bgcolor=#fefefe
| 143775 ||  || — || November 18, 2003 || Kitt Peak || Spacewatch || — || align=right | 1.4 km || 
|-id=776 bgcolor=#fefefe
| 143776 ||  || — || November 18, 2003 || Kitt Peak || Spacewatch || — || align=right | 1.2 km || 
|-id=777 bgcolor=#fefefe
| 143777 ||  || — || November 19, 2003 || Kitt Peak || Spacewatch || — || align=right | 1.3 km || 
|-id=778 bgcolor=#fefefe
| 143778 ||  || — || November 19, 2003 || Kitt Peak || Spacewatch || — || align=right | 1.5 km || 
|-id=779 bgcolor=#fefefe
| 143779 ||  || — || November 19, 2003 || Kitt Peak || Spacewatch || — || align=right | 1.5 km || 
|-id=780 bgcolor=#fefefe
| 143780 ||  || — || November 19, 2003 || Kitt Peak || Spacewatch || — || align=right | 1.4 km || 
|-id=781 bgcolor=#fefefe
| 143781 ||  || — || November 19, 2003 || Kitt Peak || Spacewatch || FLO || align=right | 1.1 km || 
|-id=782 bgcolor=#fefefe
| 143782 ||  || — || November 19, 2003 || Kitt Peak || Spacewatch || V || align=right data-sort-value="0.95" | 950 m || 
|-id=783 bgcolor=#fefefe
| 143783 ||  || — || November 20, 2003 || Socorro || LINEAR || — || align=right | 1.2 km || 
|-id=784 bgcolor=#E9E9E9
| 143784 ||  || — || November 20, 2003 || Socorro || LINEAR || ADE || align=right | 5.7 km || 
|-id=785 bgcolor=#fefefe
| 143785 ||  || — || November 19, 2003 || Kitt Peak || Spacewatch || V || align=right | 1.2 km || 
|-id=786 bgcolor=#fefefe
| 143786 ||  || — || November 18, 2003 || Kitt Peak || Spacewatch || — || align=right data-sort-value="0.97" | 970 m || 
|-id=787 bgcolor=#fefefe
| 143787 ||  || — || November 18, 2003 || Palomar || NEAT || — || align=right | 1.2 km || 
|-id=788 bgcolor=#fefefe
| 143788 ||  || — || November 18, 2003 || Palomar || NEAT || FLO || align=right | 1.0 km || 
|-id=789 bgcolor=#fefefe
| 143789 ||  || — || November 19, 2003 || Anderson Mesa || LONEOS || — || align=right | 1.3 km || 
|-id=790 bgcolor=#fefefe
| 143790 ||  || — || November 19, 2003 || Anderson Mesa || LONEOS || FLO || align=right data-sort-value="0.98" | 980 m || 
|-id=791 bgcolor=#fefefe
| 143791 ||  || — || November 21, 2003 || Socorro || LINEAR || — || align=right | 1.3 km || 
|-id=792 bgcolor=#fefefe
| 143792 ||  || — || November 21, 2003 || Socorro || LINEAR || — || align=right | 1.00 km || 
|-id=793 bgcolor=#fefefe
| 143793 ||  || — || November 21, 2003 || Socorro || LINEAR || — || align=right | 1.3 km || 
|-id=794 bgcolor=#fefefe
| 143794 ||  || — || November 21, 2003 || Socorro || LINEAR || — || align=right | 2.4 km || 
|-id=795 bgcolor=#fefefe
| 143795 ||  || — || November 21, 2003 || Socorro || LINEAR || — || align=right | 1.7 km || 
|-id=796 bgcolor=#fefefe
| 143796 ||  || — || November 23, 2003 || Socorro || LINEAR || — || align=right | 1.7 km || 
|-id=797 bgcolor=#fefefe
| 143797 ||  || — || November 20, 2003 || Socorro || LINEAR || — || align=right | 1.6 km || 
|-id=798 bgcolor=#fefefe
| 143798 ||  || — || November 20, 2003 || Socorro || LINEAR || FLO || align=right | 1.0 km || 
|-id=799 bgcolor=#d6d6d6
| 143799 ||  || — || November 20, 2003 || Socorro || LINEAR || 3:2 || align=right | 8.1 km || 
|-id=800 bgcolor=#fefefe
| 143800 ||  || — || November 20, 2003 || Socorro || LINEAR || — || align=right | 1.4 km || 
|}

143801–143900 

|-bgcolor=#fefefe
| 143801 ||  || — || November 20, 2003 || Socorro || LINEAR || V || align=right | 1.3 km || 
|-id=802 bgcolor=#fefefe
| 143802 ||  || — || November 20, 2003 || Socorro || LINEAR || — || align=right | 1.5 km || 
|-id=803 bgcolor=#fefefe
| 143803 ||  || — || November 20, 2003 || Socorro || LINEAR || NYS || align=right | 1.1 km || 
|-id=804 bgcolor=#fefefe
| 143804 ||  || — || November 20, 2003 || Socorro || LINEAR || — || align=right | 1.2 km || 
|-id=805 bgcolor=#fefefe
| 143805 ||  || — || November 20, 2003 || Socorro || LINEAR || — || align=right | 1.6 km || 
|-id=806 bgcolor=#fefefe
| 143806 ||  || — || November 20, 2003 || Socorro || LINEAR || FLO || align=right | 1.3 km || 
|-id=807 bgcolor=#fefefe
| 143807 ||  || — || November 20, 2003 || Socorro || LINEAR || — || align=right | 1.4 km || 
|-id=808 bgcolor=#fefefe
| 143808 ||  || — || November 20, 2003 || Socorro || LINEAR || — || align=right | 1.5 km || 
|-id=809 bgcolor=#fefefe
| 143809 ||  || — || November 20, 2003 || Socorro || LINEAR || FLO || align=right | 1.1 km || 
|-id=810 bgcolor=#E9E9E9
| 143810 ||  || — || November 20, 2003 || Socorro || LINEAR || EUN || align=right | 3.2 km || 
|-id=811 bgcolor=#fefefe
| 143811 ||  || — || November 21, 2003 || Socorro || LINEAR || — || align=right | 1.1 km || 
|-id=812 bgcolor=#fefefe
| 143812 ||  || — || November 19, 2003 || Anderson Mesa || LONEOS || — || align=right | 1.6 km || 
|-id=813 bgcolor=#fefefe
| 143813 ||  || — || November 21, 2003 || Socorro || LINEAR || — || align=right | 1.7 km || 
|-id=814 bgcolor=#fefefe
| 143814 ||  || — || November 21, 2003 || Socorro || LINEAR || FLO || align=right | 1.1 km || 
|-id=815 bgcolor=#fefefe
| 143815 ||  || — || November 21, 2003 || Socorro || LINEAR || — || align=right | 1.6 km || 
|-id=816 bgcolor=#fefefe
| 143816 ||  || — || November 21, 2003 || Socorro || LINEAR || — || align=right | 1.5 km || 
|-id=817 bgcolor=#fefefe
| 143817 ||  || — || November 21, 2003 || Socorro || LINEAR || FLO || align=right | 1.0 km || 
|-id=818 bgcolor=#fefefe
| 143818 ||  || — || November 21, 2003 || Socorro || LINEAR || — || align=right | 1.2 km || 
|-id=819 bgcolor=#fefefe
| 143819 ||  || — || November 21, 2003 || Socorro || LINEAR || — || align=right | 1.3 km || 
|-id=820 bgcolor=#fefefe
| 143820 ||  || — || November 21, 2003 || Socorro || LINEAR || FLO || align=right | 1.0 km || 
|-id=821 bgcolor=#fefefe
| 143821 ||  || — || November 21, 2003 || Socorro || LINEAR || FLO || align=right | 1.3 km || 
|-id=822 bgcolor=#fefefe
| 143822 ||  || — || November 21, 2003 || Socorro || LINEAR || PHO || align=right | 2.7 km || 
|-id=823 bgcolor=#fefefe
| 143823 ||  || — || November 21, 2003 || Socorro || LINEAR || — || align=right | 1.9 km || 
|-id=824 bgcolor=#fefefe
| 143824 ||  || — || November 21, 2003 || Socorro || LINEAR || — || align=right | 1.0 km || 
|-id=825 bgcolor=#fefefe
| 143825 ||  || — || November 23, 2003 || Kitt Peak || Spacewatch || — || align=right | 1.3 km || 
|-id=826 bgcolor=#fefefe
| 143826 ||  || — || November 24, 2003 || Anderson Mesa || LONEOS || — || align=right | 1.5 km || 
|-id=827 bgcolor=#fefefe
| 143827 ||  || — || November 24, 2003 || Anderson Mesa || LONEOS || — || align=right | 1.6 km || 
|-id=828 bgcolor=#fefefe
| 143828 ||  || — || November 24, 2003 || Anderson Mesa || LONEOS || — || align=right | 1.7 km || 
|-id=829 bgcolor=#fefefe
| 143829 ||  || — || November 19, 2003 || Socorro || LINEAR || V || align=right data-sort-value="0.99" | 990 m || 
|-id=830 bgcolor=#fefefe
| 143830 ||  || — || November 26, 2003 || Socorro || LINEAR || — || align=right | 2.2 km || 
|-id=831 bgcolor=#fefefe
| 143831 ||  || — || November 30, 2003 || Socorro || LINEAR || — || align=right | 1.4 km || 
|-id=832 bgcolor=#E9E9E9
| 143832 ||  || — || November 29, 2003 || Catalina || CSS || — || align=right | 7.0 km || 
|-id=833 bgcolor=#fefefe
| 143833 ||  || — || November 30, 2003 || Kitt Peak || Spacewatch || NYS || align=right | 1.2 km || 
|-id=834 bgcolor=#fefefe
| 143834 ||  || — || November 19, 2003 || Palomar || NEAT || FLO || align=right | 1.0 km || 
|-id=835 bgcolor=#fefefe
| 143835 ||  || — || November 20, 2003 || Socorro || LINEAR || NYS || align=right | 1.1 km || 
|-id=836 bgcolor=#fefefe
| 143836 ||  || — || December 1, 2003 || Kitt Peak || Spacewatch || FLO || align=right | 1.2 km || 
|-id=837 bgcolor=#fefefe
| 143837 ||  || — || December 1, 2003 || Socorro || LINEAR || — || align=right | 1.7 km || 
|-id=838 bgcolor=#fefefe
| 143838 ||  || — || December 3, 2003 || Socorro || LINEAR || V || align=right | 1.1 km || 
|-id=839 bgcolor=#fefefe
| 143839 ||  || — || December 14, 2003 || Palomar || NEAT || — || align=right | 1.3 km || 
|-id=840 bgcolor=#fefefe
| 143840 ||  || — || December 14, 2003 || Kitt Peak || Spacewatch || — || align=right | 1.8 km || 
|-id=841 bgcolor=#fefefe
| 143841 ||  || — || December 14, 2003 || Kitt Peak || Spacewatch || — || align=right | 1.3 km || 
|-id=842 bgcolor=#fefefe
| 143842 ||  || — || December 1, 2003 || Socorro || LINEAR || FLO || align=right data-sort-value="0.93" | 930 m || 
|-id=843 bgcolor=#fefefe
| 143843 ||  || — || December 3, 2003 || Socorro || LINEAR || — || align=right | 1.5 km || 
|-id=844 bgcolor=#fefefe
| 143844 ||  || — || December 4, 2003 || Socorro || LINEAR || FLO || align=right | 1.0 km || 
|-id=845 bgcolor=#fefefe
| 143845 ||  || — || December 4, 2003 || Socorro || LINEAR || — || align=right | 1.3 km || 
|-id=846 bgcolor=#fefefe
| 143846 ||  || — || December 16, 2003 || Anderson Mesa || LONEOS || — || align=right | 1.4 km || 
|-id=847 bgcolor=#fefefe
| 143847 ||  || — || December 17, 2003 || Kitt Peak || Spacewatch || — || align=right | 1.4 km || 
|-id=848 bgcolor=#fefefe
| 143848 ||  || — || December 16, 2003 || Anderson Mesa || LONEOS || — || align=right | 3.3 km || 
|-id=849 bgcolor=#fefefe
| 143849 ||  || — || December 17, 2003 || Socorro || LINEAR || — || align=right | 1.6 km || 
|-id=850 bgcolor=#fefefe
| 143850 ||  || — || December 17, 2003 || Socorro || LINEAR || FLO || align=right | 1.1 km || 
|-id=851 bgcolor=#fefefe
| 143851 ||  || — || December 17, 2003 || Palomar || NEAT || — || align=right | 1.6 km || 
|-id=852 bgcolor=#fefefe
| 143852 ||  || — || December 20, 2003 || Nashville || R. Clingan || — || align=right | 1.2 km || 
|-id=853 bgcolor=#fefefe
| 143853 ||  || — || December 20, 2003 || Socorro || LINEAR || — || align=right | 1.4 km || 
|-id=854 bgcolor=#fefefe
| 143854 ||  || — || December 19, 2003 || Socorro || LINEAR || FLO || align=right | 1.1 km || 
|-id=855 bgcolor=#fefefe
| 143855 ||  || — || December 20, 2003 || Socorro || LINEAR || — || align=right | 1.8 km || 
|-id=856 bgcolor=#fefefe
| 143856 ||  || — || December 17, 2003 || Socorro || LINEAR || — || align=right | 1.7 km || 
|-id=857 bgcolor=#fefefe
| 143857 ||  || — || December 17, 2003 || Socorro || LINEAR || — || align=right | 1.3 km || 
|-id=858 bgcolor=#E9E9E9
| 143858 ||  || — || December 17, 2003 || Socorro || LINEAR || — || align=right | 5.3 km || 
|-id=859 bgcolor=#fefefe
| 143859 ||  || — || December 17, 2003 || Anderson Mesa || LONEOS || — || align=right | 1.6 km || 
|-id=860 bgcolor=#fefefe
| 143860 ||  || — || December 17, 2003 || Anderson Mesa || LONEOS || FLO || align=right | 1.1 km || 
|-id=861 bgcolor=#fefefe
| 143861 ||  || — || December 17, 2003 || Catalina || CSS || ERI || align=right | 3.7 km || 
|-id=862 bgcolor=#fefefe
| 143862 ||  || — || December 17, 2003 || Catalina || CSS || FLO || align=right | 1.3 km || 
|-id=863 bgcolor=#fefefe
| 143863 ||  || — || December 17, 2003 || Socorro || LINEAR || V || align=right | 1.3 km || 
|-id=864 bgcolor=#fefefe
| 143864 ||  || — || December 17, 2003 || Socorro || LINEAR || FLO || align=right | 1.5 km || 
|-id=865 bgcolor=#fefefe
| 143865 ||  || — || December 17, 2003 || Anderson Mesa || LONEOS || FLO || align=right | 1.4 km || 
|-id=866 bgcolor=#fefefe
| 143866 ||  || — || December 17, 2003 || Anderson Mesa || LONEOS || — || align=right | 1.5 km || 
|-id=867 bgcolor=#E9E9E9
| 143867 ||  || — || December 17, 2003 || Palomar || NEAT || — || align=right | 2.6 km || 
|-id=868 bgcolor=#fefefe
| 143868 ||  || — || December 16, 2003 || Anderson Mesa || LONEOS || — || align=right | 1.5 km || 
|-id=869 bgcolor=#fefefe
| 143869 ||  || — || December 17, 2003 || Kitt Peak || Spacewatch || — || align=right | 1.4 km || 
|-id=870 bgcolor=#fefefe
| 143870 ||  || — || December 18, 2003 || Socorro || LINEAR || — || align=right | 1.5 km || 
|-id=871 bgcolor=#fefefe
| 143871 ||  || — || December 17, 2003 || Socorro || LINEAR || V || align=right | 1.0 km || 
|-id=872 bgcolor=#fefefe
| 143872 ||  || — || December 17, 2003 || Anderson Mesa || LONEOS || V || align=right data-sort-value="0.95" | 950 m || 
|-id=873 bgcolor=#E9E9E9
| 143873 ||  || — || December 17, 2003 || Socorro || LINEAR || ADE || align=right | 4.5 km || 
|-id=874 bgcolor=#fefefe
| 143874 ||  || — || December 17, 2003 || Kitt Peak || Spacewatch || V || align=right | 1.2 km || 
|-id=875 bgcolor=#fefefe
| 143875 ||  || — || December 17, 2003 || Kitt Peak || Spacewatch || — || align=right | 1.2 km || 
|-id=876 bgcolor=#fefefe
| 143876 ||  || — || December 18, 2003 || Socorro || LINEAR || — || align=right | 1.4 km || 
|-id=877 bgcolor=#fefefe
| 143877 ||  || — || December 18, 2003 || Socorro || LINEAR || V || align=right | 1.1 km || 
|-id=878 bgcolor=#fefefe
| 143878 ||  || — || December 16, 2003 || Črni Vrh || Črni Vrh || V || align=right | 1.2 km || 
|-id=879 bgcolor=#E9E9E9
| 143879 ||  || — || December 17, 2003 || Socorro || LINEAR || — || align=right | 2.1 km || 
|-id=880 bgcolor=#fefefe
| 143880 ||  || — || December 17, 2003 || Palomar || NEAT || FLO || align=right | 1.2 km || 
|-id=881 bgcolor=#fefefe
| 143881 ||  || — || December 17, 2003 || Kitt Peak || Spacewatch || NYS || align=right | 1.1 km || 
|-id=882 bgcolor=#fefefe
| 143882 ||  || — || December 17, 2003 || Kitt Peak || Spacewatch || — || align=right | 1.2 km || 
|-id=883 bgcolor=#fefefe
| 143883 ||  || — || December 18, 2003 || Kitt Peak || Spacewatch || MAS || align=right | 1.2 km || 
|-id=884 bgcolor=#fefefe
| 143884 ||  || — || December 17, 2003 || Kitt Peak || Spacewatch || FLO || align=right | 1.1 km || 
|-id=885 bgcolor=#fefefe
| 143885 ||  || — || December 18, 2003 || Socorro || LINEAR || FLO || align=right | 1.3 km || 
|-id=886 bgcolor=#fefefe
| 143886 ||  || — || December 18, 2003 || Haleakala || NEAT || — || align=right | 1.5 km || 
|-id=887 bgcolor=#fefefe
| 143887 ||  || — || December 18, 2003 || Socorro || LINEAR || — || align=right | 1.3 km || 
|-id=888 bgcolor=#fefefe
| 143888 ||  || — || December 19, 2003 || Kitt Peak || Spacewatch || — || align=right | 2.2 km || 
|-id=889 bgcolor=#E9E9E9
| 143889 ||  || — || December 19, 2003 || Kitt Peak || Spacewatch || — || align=right | 2.3 km || 
|-id=890 bgcolor=#E9E9E9
| 143890 ||  || — || December 19, 2003 || Kitt Peak || Spacewatch || — || align=right | 1.9 km || 
|-id=891 bgcolor=#fefefe
| 143891 ||  || — || December 19, 2003 || Socorro || LINEAR || NYS || align=right | 1.2 km || 
|-id=892 bgcolor=#fefefe
| 143892 ||  || — || December 19, 2003 || Socorro || LINEAR || — || align=right | 1.4 km || 
|-id=893 bgcolor=#fefefe
| 143893 ||  || — || December 19, 2003 || Kitt Peak || Spacewatch || V || align=right data-sort-value="0.98" | 980 m || 
|-id=894 bgcolor=#fefefe
| 143894 ||  || — || December 17, 2003 || Socorro || LINEAR || V || align=right | 1.2 km || 
|-id=895 bgcolor=#fefefe
| 143895 ||  || — || December 18, 2003 || Socorro || LINEAR || — || align=right | 1.7 km || 
|-id=896 bgcolor=#E9E9E9
| 143896 ||  || — || December 19, 2003 || Socorro || LINEAR || — || align=right | 1.6 km || 
|-id=897 bgcolor=#E9E9E9
| 143897 ||  || — || December 19, 2003 || Socorro || LINEAR || — || align=right | 2.0 km || 
|-id=898 bgcolor=#fefefe
| 143898 ||  || — || December 19, 2003 || Socorro || LINEAR || V || align=right | 1.3 km || 
|-id=899 bgcolor=#fefefe
| 143899 ||  || — || December 19, 2003 || Socorro || LINEAR || NYS || align=right | 1.2 km || 
|-id=900 bgcolor=#fefefe
| 143900 ||  || — || December 19, 2003 || Socorro || LINEAR || — || align=right | 4.0 km || 
|}

143901–144000 

|-bgcolor=#fefefe
| 143901 ||  || — || December 19, 2003 || Kitt Peak || Spacewatch || NYS || align=right data-sort-value="0.93" | 930 m || 
|-id=902 bgcolor=#fefefe
| 143902 ||  || — || December 19, 2003 || Socorro || LINEAR || V || align=right | 1.3 km || 
|-id=903 bgcolor=#fefefe
| 143903 ||  || — || December 19, 2003 || Socorro || LINEAR || — || align=right | 1.5 km || 
|-id=904 bgcolor=#fefefe
| 143904 ||  || — || December 19, 2003 || Socorro || LINEAR || — || align=right | 1.5 km || 
|-id=905 bgcolor=#fefefe
| 143905 ||  || — || December 19, 2003 || Socorro || LINEAR || — || align=right | 1.6 km || 
|-id=906 bgcolor=#fefefe
| 143906 ||  || — || December 19, 2003 || Socorro || LINEAR || — || align=right | 1.6 km || 
|-id=907 bgcolor=#fefefe
| 143907 ||  || — || December 19, 2003 || Socorro || LINEAR || V || align=right | 1.2 km || 
|-id=908 bgcolor=#fefefe
| 143908 ||  || — || December 19, 2003 || Socorro || LINEAR || V || align=right | 1.2 km || 
|-id=909 bgcolor=#fefefe
| 143909 ||  || — || December 20, 2003 || Socorro || LINEAR || ERI || align=right | 2.6 km || 
|-id=910 bgcolor=#fefefe
| 143910 ||  || — || December 20, 2003 || Socorro || LINEAR || FLO || align=right | 1.2 km || 
|-id=911 bgcolor=#fefefe
| 143911 ||  || — || December 20, 2003 || Socorro || LINEAR || — || align=right | 2.9 km || 
|-id=912 bgcolor=#fefefe
| 143912 ||  || — || December 19, 2003 || Socorro || LINEAR || FLO || align=right | 1.1 km || 
|-id=913 bgcolor=#fefefe
| 143913 ||  || — || December 18, 2003 || Socorro || LINEAR || NYS || align=right | 2.4 km || 
|-id=914 bgcolor=#fefefe
| 143914 ||  || — || December 18, 2003 || Socorro || LINEAR || — || align=right | 1.4 km || 
|-id=915 bgcolor=#fefefe
| 143915 ||  || — || December 18, 2003 || Socorro || LINEAR || NYS || align=right | 1.3 km || 
|-id=916 bgcolor=#fefefe
| 143916 ||  || — || December 18, 2003 || Socorro || LINEAR || — || align=right | 1.5 km || 
|-id=917 bgcolor=#E9E9E9
| 143917 ||  || — || December 18, 2003 || Socorro || LINEAR || — || align=right | 2.3 km || 
|-id=918 bgcolor=#fefefe
| 143918 ||  || — || December 18, 2003 || Socorro || LINEAR || — || align=right | 1.7 km || 
|-id=919 bgcolor=#E9E9E9
| 143919 ||  || — || December 18, 2003 || Socorro || LINEAR || — || align=right | 3.3 km || 
|-id=920 bgcolor=#fefefe
| 143920 ||  || — || December 18, 2003 || Socorro || LINEAR || — || align=right | 1.2 km || 
|-id=921 bgcolor=#fefefe
| 143921 ||  || — || December 19, 2003 || Socorro || LINEAR || V || align=right | 1.1 km || 
|-id=922 bgcolor=#fefefe
| 143922 ||  || — || December 19, 2003 || Socorro || LINEAR || V || align=right | 1.2 km || 
|-id=923 bgcolor=#E9E9E9
| 143923 ||  || — || December 19, 2003 || Socorro || LINEAR || — || align=right | 3.7 km || 
|-id=924 bgcolor=#E9E9E9
| 143924 ||  || — || December 19, 2003 || Socorro || LINEAR || — || align=right | 1.8 km || 
|-id=925 bgcolor=#fefefe
| 143925 ||  || — || December 19, 2003 || Socorro || LINEAR || — || align=right | 3.1 km || 
|-id=926 bgcolor=#fefefe
| 143926 ||  || — || December 19, 2003 || Kitt Peak || Spacewatch || — || align=right | 1.9 km || 
|-id=927 bgcolor=#E9E9E9
| 143927 ||  || — || December 19, 2003 || Kitt Peak || Spacewatch || — || align=right | 1.9 km || 
|-id=928 bgcolor=#fefefe
| 143928 ||  || — || December 20, 2003 || Socorro || LINEAR || — || align=right | 1.4 km || 
|-id=929 bgcolor=#fefefe
| 143929 ||  || — || December 20, 2003 || Socorro || LINEAR || FLO || align=right | 1.0 km || 
|-id=930 bgcolor=#fefefe
| 143930 ||  || — || December 19, 2003 || Kitt Peak || Spacewatch || FLO || align=right data-sort-value="0.93" | 930 m || 
|-id=931 bgcolor=#fefefe
| 143931 ||  || — || December 19, 2003 || Socorro || LINEAR || NYS || align=right | 1.2 km || 
|-id=932 bgcolor=#E9E9E9
| 143932 ||  || — || December 19, 2003 || Socorro || LINEAR || — || align=right | 1.8 km || 
|-id=933 bgcolor=#fefefe
| 143933 ||  || — || December 21, 2003 || Socorro || LINEAR || — || align=right | 1.1 km || 
|-id=934 bgcolor=#fefefe
| 143934 ||  || — || December 21, 2003 || Socorro || LINEAR || — || align=right | 1.6 km || 
|-id=935 bgcolor=#fefefe
| 143935 ||  || — || December 22, 2003 || Socorro || LINEAR || V || align=right data-sort-value="0.92" | 920 m || 
|-id=936 bgcolor=#fefefe
| 143936 ||  || — || December 22, 2003 || Socorro || LINEAR || — || align=right | 1.5 km || 
|-id=937 bgcolor=#fefefe
| 143937 ||  || — || December 22, 2003 || Socorro || LINEAR || V || align=right | 1.3 km || 
|-id=938 bgcolor=#fefefe
| 143938 ||  || — || December 22, 2003 || Catalina || CSS || — || align=right | 1.5 km || 
|-id=939 bgcolor=#fefefe
| 143939 ||  || — || December 22, 2003 || Kitt Peak || Spacewatch || NYS || align=right data-sort-value="0.79" | 790 m || 
|-id=940 bgcolor=#fefefe
| 143940 ||  || — || December 24, 2003 || Socorro || LINEAR || — || align=right | 1.2 km || 
|-id=941 bgcolor=#fefefe
| 143941 ||  || — || December 27, 2003 || Socorro || LINEAR || NYS || align=right data-sort-value="0.84" | 840 m || 
|-id=942 bgcolor=#fefefe
| 143942 ||  || — || December 27, 2003 || Socorro || LINEAR || — || align=right | 1.4 km || 
|-id=943 bgcolor=#E9E9E9
| 143943 ||  || — || December 27, 2003 || Socorro || LINEAR || — || align=right | 2.0 km || 
|-id=944 bgcolor=#fefefe
| 143944 ||  || — || December 27, 2003 || Socorro || LINEAR || — || align=right | 1.7 km || 
|-id=945 bgcolor=#fefefe
| 143945 ||  || — || December 27, 2003 || Socorro || LINEAR || — || align=right | 1.5 km || 
|-id=946 bgcolor=#fefefe
| 143946 ||  || — || December 27, 2003 || Socorro || LINEAR || V || align=right | 1.1 km || 
|-id=947 bgcolor=#FFC2E0
| 143947 ||  || — || December 26, 2003 || Haleakala || NEAT || APO +1km || align=right | 3.0 km || 
|-id=948 bgcolor=#fefefe
| 143948 ||  || — || December 23, 2003 || Socorro || LINEAR || — || align=right | 1.3 km || 
|-id=949 bgcolor=#fefefe
| 143949 ||  || — || December 27, 2003 || Socorro || LINEAR || FLO || align=right | 1.1 km || 
|-id=950 bgcolor=#fefefe
| 143950 ||  || — || December 27, 2003 || Socorro || LINEAR || V || align=right | 1.2 km || 
|-id=951 bgcolor=#fefefe
| 143951 ||  || — || December 27, 2003 || Socorro || LINEAR || V || align=right | 1.2 km || 
|-id=952 bgcolor=#fefefe
| 143952 ||  || — || December 28, 2003 || Socorro || LINEAR || — || align=right | 1.4 km || 
|-id=953 bgcolor=#fefefe
| 143953 ||  || — || December 27, 2003 || Kitt Peak || Spacewatch || — || align=right | 1.3 km || 
|-id=954 bgcolor=#E9E9E9
| 143954 ||  || — || December 27, 2003 || Socorro || LINEAR || HEN || align=right | 1.9 km || 
|-id=955 bgcolor=#fefefe
| 143955 ||  || — || December 27, 2003 || Socorro || LINEAR || NYS || align=right | 1.1 km || 
|-id=956 bgcolor=#fefefe
| 143956 ||  || — || December 27, 2003 || Haleakala || NEAT || NYS || align=right | 1.0 km || 
|-id=957 bgcolor=#fefefe
| 143957 ||  || — || December 27, 2003 || Socorro || LINEAR || — || align=right | 2.4 km || 
|-id=958 bgcolor=#fefefe
| 143958 ||  || — || December 27, 2003 || Socorro || LINEAR || — || align=right | 1.6 km || 
|-id=959 bgcolor=#fefefe
| 143959 ||  || — || December 27, 2003 || Socorro || LINEAR || — || align=right | 1.2 km || 
|-id=960 bgcolor=#fefefe
| 143960 ||  || — || December 27, 2003 || Socorro || LINEAR || — || align=right | 1.5 km || 
|-id=961 bgcolor=#E9E9E9
| 143961 ||  || — || December 27, 2003 || Socorro || LINEAR || — || align=right | 2.5 km || 
|-id=962 bgcolor=#fefefe
| 143962 ||  || — || December 27, 2003 || Socorro || LINEAR || V || align=right | 1.2 km || 
|-id=963 bgcolor=#fefefe
| 143963 ||  || — || December 27, 2003 || Socorro || LINEAR || — || align=right | 2.6 km || 
|-id=964 bgcolor=#fefefe
| 143964 ||  || — || December 27, 2003 || Socorro || LINEAR || V || align=right | 1.6 km || 
|-id=965 bgcolor=#fefefe
| 143965 ||  || — || December 28, 2003 || Socorro || LINEAR || V || align=right | 1.2 km || 
|-id=966 bgcolor=#fefefe
| 143966 ||  || — || December 28, 2003 || Socorro || LINEAR || — || align=right | 1.5 km || 
|-id=967 bgcolor=#E9E9E9
| 143967 ||  || — || December 28, 2003 || Socorro || LINEAR || — || align=right | 2.4 km || 
|-id=968 bgcolor=#E9E9E9
| 143968 ||  || — || December 17, 2003 || Kitt Peak || Spacewatch || — || align=right | 2.8 km || 
|-id=969 bgcolor=#fefefe
| 143969 ||  || — || December 18, 2003 || Palomar || NEAT || FLO || align=right | 1.1 km || 
|-id=970 bgcolor=#E9E9E9
| 143970 ||  || — || December 27, 2003 || Socorro || LINEAR || — || align=right | 2.5 km || 
|-id=971 bgcolor=#fefefe
| 143971 ||  || — || December 27, 2003 || Socorro || LINEAR || — || align=right | 3.5 km || 
|-id=972 bgcolor=#E9E9E9
| 143972 ||  || — || December 28, 2003 || Socorro || LINEAR || EUN || align=right | 2.2 km || 
|-id=973 bgcolor=#fefefe
| 143973 ||  || — || December 28, 2003 || Kitt Peak || Spacewatch || V || align=right | 1.1 km || 
|-id=974 bgcolor=#E9E9E9
| 143974 ||  || — || December 28, 2003 || Socorro || LINEAR || ADE || align=right | 5.5 km || 
|-id=975 bgcolor=#E9E9E9
| 143975 ||  || — || December 28, 2003 || Socorro || LINEAR || EUN || align=right | 2.3 km || 
|-id=976 bgcolor=#fefefe
| 143976 ||  || — || December 28, 2003 || Socorro || LINEAR || FLO || align=right | 1.0 km || 
|-id=977 bgcolor=#fefefe
| 143977 ||  || — || December 28, 2003 || Socorro || LINEAR || — || align=right | 1.7 km || 
|-id=978 bgcolor=#E9E9E9
| 143978 ||  || — || December 28, 2003 || Socorro || LINEAR || — || align=right | 3.9 km || 
|-id=979 bgcolor=#E9E9E9
| 143979 ||  || — || December 28, 2003 || Socorro || LINEAR || — || align=right | 3.2 km || 
|-id=980 bgcolor=#E9E9E9
| 143980 ||  || — || December 29, 2003 || Socorro || LINEAR || EUN || align=right | 2.1 km || 
|-id=981 bgcolor=#fefefe
| 143981 ||  || — || December 29, 2003 || Socorro || LINEAR || FLO || align=right data-sort-value="0.99" | 990 m || 
|-id=982 bgcolor=#fefefe
| 143982 ||  || — || December 29, 2003 || Anderson Mesa || LONEOS || MAS || align=right data-sort-value="0.92" | 920 m || 
|-id=983 bgcolor=#E9E9E9
| 143983 ||  || — || December 29, 2003 || Socorro || LINEAR || — || align=right | 4.1 km || 
|-id=984 bgcolor=#E9E9E9
| 143984 ||  || — || December 29, 2003 || Catalina || CSS || — || align=right | 2.5 km || 
|-id=985 bgcolor=#E9E9E9
| 143985 ||  || — || December 29, 2003 || Catalina || CSS || ADE || align=right | 5.1 km || 
|-id=986 bgcolor=#E9E9E9
| 143986 ||  || — || December 29, 2003 || Catalina || CSS || EUN || align=right | 2.2 km || 
|-id=987 bgcolor=#E9E9E9
| 143987 ||  || — || December 29, 2003 || Socorro || LINEAR || — || align=right | 4.8 km || 
|-id=988 bgcolor=#E9E9E9
| 143988 ||  || — || December 29, 2003 || Socorro || LINEAR || — || align=right | 4.0 km || 
|-id=989 bgcolor=#fefefe
| 143989 ||  || — || December 17, 2003 || Socorro || LINEAR || — || align=right | 1.7 km || 
|-id=990 bgcolor=#E9E9E9
| 143990 ||  || — || December 19, 2003 || Kitt Peak || Spacewatch || — || align=right | 2.1 km || 
|-id=991 bgcolor=#C2E0FF
| 143991 ||  || — || December 17, 2003 || Mauna Kea || Mauna Kea Obs. || other TNOcritical || align=right | 328 km || 
|-id=992 bgcolor=#FFC2E0
| 143992 || 2004 AF || — || January 5, 2004 || Socorro || LINEAR || APO +1kmPHA || align=right | 2.2 km || 
|-id=993 bgcolor=#fefefe
| 143993 ||  || — || January 13, 2004 || Anderson Mesa || LONEOS || — || align=right | 2.1 km || 
|-id=994 bgcolor=#fefefe
| 143994 ||  || — || January 13, 2004 || Anderson Mesa || LONEOS || — || align=right | 1.5 km || 
|-id=995 bgcolor=#fefefe
| 143995 ||  || — || January 13, 2004 || Anderson Mesa || LONEOS || — || align=right | 1.6 km || 
|-id=996 bgcolor=#fefefe
| 143996 ||  || — || January 13, 2004 || Anderson Mesa || LONEOS || — || align=right | 1.3 km || 
|-id=997 bgcolor=#fefefe
| 143997 ||  || — || January 13, 2004 || Anderson Mesa || LONEOS || V || align=right data-sort-value="0.99" | 990 m || 
|-id=998 bgcolor=#fefefe
| 143998 ||  || — || January 12, 2004 || Palomar || NEAT || FLO || align=right | 1.1 km || 
|-id=999 bgcolor=#E9E9E9
| 143999 ||  || — || January 12, 2004 || Palomar || NEAT || — || align=right | 2.5 km || 
|-id=000 bgcolor=#fefefe
| 144000 ||  || — || January 12, 2004 || Palomar || NEAT || FLO || align=right | 1.2 km || 
|}

References

External links 
 Discovery Circumstances: Numbered Minor Planets (140001)–(145000) (IAU Minor Planet Center)

0143